= 2023 Las Vegas Raiders season =

64th season in franchise history

- Owner: Mark Davis
- General manager: Dave Ziegler (fired October 31); Champ Kelly (interim)
- Head coach: Josh McDaniels (fired October 31, 3–5 record); Antonio Pierce (interim, 5–4 record)
- Home stadium: Allegiant Stadium

Results
- Record: 8–9
- Division place: 2nd AFC West
- Playoffs: Did not qualify
- All-Pros: P A. J. Cole III (1st team); DE Maxx Crosby (2nd team)
- Pro Bowlers: DE Maxx Crosby; P A. J. Cole III

Uniform
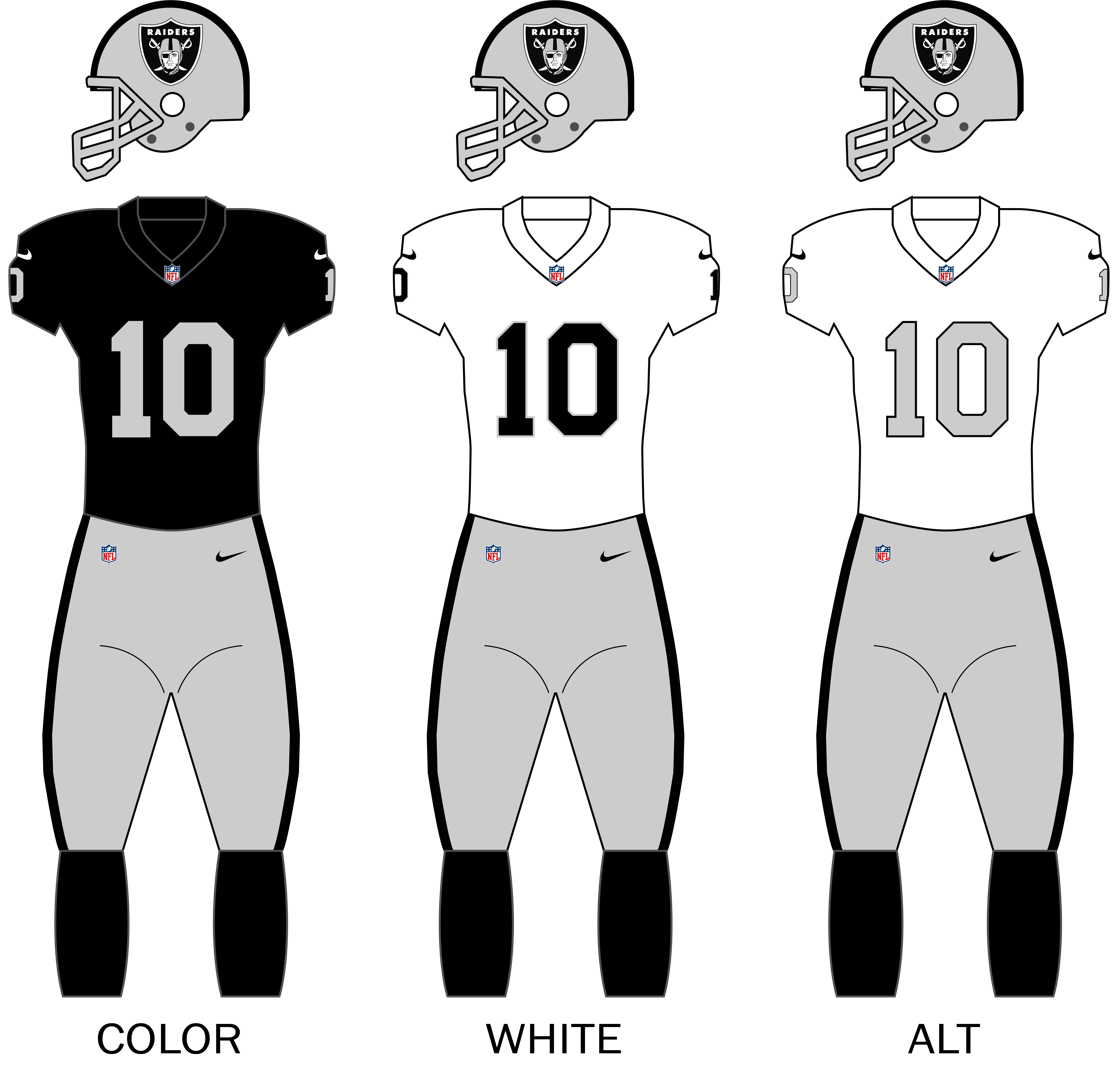

The 2023 season was the Las Vegas Raiders' 54th season in the National Football League (NFL), their 64th overall, their fourth in Las Vegas, and their second and final under the head coach/general manager tandem of Josh McDaniels and Dave Ziegler. On October 31, following a Week 8 loss to the Detroit Lions, the Raiders fired McDaniels and Ziegler. The Raiders named linebackers coach Antonio Pierce interim head coach, and assistant general manager Champ Kelly interim general manager. Following the season, the team named Antonio Pierce the full-time head coach after the team finished the season with a record of 5–4 under Pierce.

The season was the first since 2013 without longtime quarterback Derek Carr on the opening day roster, as he was released on Valentine's Day. The Raiders improved on their 6–11 record from the previous season following their Christmas Day win over the Kansas City Chiefs. However, the Raiders were eliminated from playoff contention for the second consecutive year after a loss to the Indianapolis Colts the next week. They finished the season 8–9 to finish in second place in the division.

On December 14, 2023, the team set a franchise record for most points scored in a game, defeating the Los Angeles Chargers 63–21.

The Las Vegas Raiders drew an average home attendance of 62,190 in 9 home games in the 2023 NFL season.

== Offseason ==
=== Notable free agent acquisitions ===
Position	Player	Age	2022 team
QB	Jimmy Garoppolo	31	San Francisco 49ers
WR	Jakobi Meyers	26	New England Patriots
TE	Austin Hooper	28	Tennessee Titans

=== Trades ===
March 15	To Las Vegas Raiders 2023 compensatory 3rd round pick (Tre Tucker)	To New York Giants Darren Waller

=== Notable players released ===
Position	Player	Age	2023 team
QB	Derek Carr	31	New Orleans Saints

=== Draft ===
2023 Las Vegas Raiders draft selections
Round	Selection	Player	Position	College	Notes
1	7	Tyree Wilson	DE	Texas Tech	
2	35	Michael Mayer	TE	Notre Dame	From Colts (Note: The Raiders traded second- and fifth-round selections (38th and 141st overall) to the Indianapolis Colts in exchange for a second-round selection (35th overall).)
2	38	Traded to the Indianapolis Colts			
3	70	Byron Young	DT	Alabama	
3	100	Tre Tucker	WR	Cincinnati	From Chiefs via Giants (Note: The Raiders traded TE Darren Waller to the New York Giants in exchange for a third-round selection (100th overall).)
4	104	Jakorian Bennett	CB	Maryland	From Texans (Note: The Raiders traded fourth- and fifth-round selections (109th and 174th overall) to the Houston Texans in exchange for fourth- and sixth-round selections (104th and 203rd overall).)
4	109	Traded to the Houston Texans			
4	135	Aidan O'Connell	QB	Purdue	From Patriots (Note: The Raiders traded fifth- and sixth-round selections (144th and 214th overall) to the New England Patriots in exchange for a fourth-round selection (135th overall).)
5	141	Traded to the Indianapolis Colts			
5	144	Traded to the New England Patriots			From Falcons (Note: The Raiders traded a seventh-round selection (224th overall) and WR Bryan Edwards to the Atlanta Falcons in exchange for a fifth-round selection (144th overall).)
5	170	Christopher Smith II	S	Georgia	Compensatory pick; from Packers via Jets (Note: The Raiders traded sixth- and seventh-round selections (204th and 220th overall) to the New York Jets in exchange for a fifth-round selection (170th overall).)
5	174	Traded to the Houston Texans			
6	184	Traded to the New England Patriots (Note: The Raiders traded a sixth-round selection (184th overall) to the New England Patriots in exchange for a seventh-round selection (231st overall) and QB Jarrett Stidham.)			
6	203	Amari Burney	LB	Florida	From Giants via Texans
6	204	Traded to the New York Jets			From Cowboys (Note: The Raiders traded a 2024 seventh-round selection and DT Johnathan Hankins to the Dallas Cowboys in exchange for a sixth-round selection (204th overall).)
6	214	Traded to the New England Patriots			
7	220	Traded to the New York Jets			From Cardinals (Note: The Raiders traded CB Trayvon Mullen to the Arizona Cardinals in exchange for a seventh-round selection (220th overall).)
7	224	Traded to the Atlanta Falcons			
7	231	Nesta Jade Silvera	DT	Arizona State	From Patriots

2023 Las Vegas Raiders undrafted free agents
Name	Position	College	Ref.
David Agoha	DL	N/A*	
McClendon Curtis	G	Chattanooga	
Jaydon Grant	S	Oregon State	
Azizi Hearn	CB	UCLA	
Brock Martin	DE	Oklahoma State	
Jordan Perryman	CB	Washington	
Adam Plant	DE	UNLV	
John Samuel Shenker	TE	Auburn	
George Tarlas	DE	Boise State	
Drake Thomas	LB	NC State	
Dalton Wagner	T	Arkansas	

* Signed as a part of the International Player Pathway Program from Nigeria.

Draft trades

== Staff ==
2023 Las Vegas Raiders staff
Front office: Owner – Mark and Carol Davis; President – Sandra Douglass Morgan; General manager – Dave Ziegler; fired on October 31; Interim general manager – Champ Kelly; Senior vice president/director of football administration – Tom Delaney; Vice president of football operations – Tom Jones; Director of pro personnel – Dwayne Joseph; Director of football systems – Brad Goldsberry; Director of college scouting – Brandon Yeargan; Senior personnel advisor – Shaun Herock; Senior national scout – DuJuan Daniels; Senior national scout – Lenny McGill; National scout – Andy Dengler; Head coaches: Head coach – Josh McDaniels; fired on October 31; Interim head coach/linebackers – Antonio Pierce; Offensive coaches: Offensive coordinator – Mick Lombardi; fired on October 31; Interim offensive coordinator/quarterbacks – Bo Hardegree; Pass game coordinator – Scott Turner; Running backs – Kennedy Polamalu; Wide receivers – Edgar Bennett; Tight ends – Jerry Schuplinski; Offensive line – Carmen Bricillo; Assistant offensive line – Cameron Clemmons; Offensive assistant/assistant wide receivers – Matt Lombardi; Offensive assistant – Fred Walker; Offensive quality control – Mitch Singler	Defensive coaches: Defensive coordinator – Patrick Graham; Senior defensive assistant – Rob Ryan; Defensive line – Rob Leonard; Defensive backs – Chris Ash; Defensive backs/pass game coordinator – Jason Simmons; Defensive assistant/pass rush specialist – Matt Edwards; Defensive quality control – Matt Feeney; Defensive quality control – Keith Heyward; Special teams coaches: Special teams coordinator – Tom McMahon; Assistant special teams – Derius Swinton II; Coaching assistant/returners – Danny Amendola; Strength and conditioning: Head strength and conditioning – A. J. Neibel; Strength and conditioning assistant – D'Anthony Batiste; Strength and conditioning assistant – Deuce Gruden; Strength and conditioning assistant – Rick Slate

== Final roster ==
2023 Las Vegas Raiders roster
Quarterbacks (QB): 10 Jimmy Garoppolo; 7 Brian Hoyer; 4 Aidan O'Connell; Running backs (RB): 22 Ameer Abdullah; 34 Brandon Bolden; 8 Josh Jacobs; 45 Jakob Johnson FB; 35 Zamir White; Wide receivers (WR): 17 Davante Adams; 3 DeAndre Carter; 16 Jakobi Meyers; 13 Hunter Renfrow; 11 Tre Tucker; 19 D. J. Turner; Tight ends (TE): 88 Zach Gentry; 81 Austin Hooper	Offensive linemen (OL): 72 Jermaine Eluemunor T; 65 Hroniss Grasu C; 68 Andre James C; 61 Jordan Meredith G; 74 Kolton Miller T; 77 Thayer Munford T; 66 Dylan Parham G; 75 Brandon Parker T; 70 Greg Van Roten G; Defensive linemen (DL): 69 Adam Butler DT; 94 Matthew Butler DT; 98 Maxx Crosby DE; 95 John Jenkins DT; 51 Malcolm Koonce DE; 91 Bilal Nichols DT; 97 Janarius Robinson DE; 90 Jerry Tillery DT; 9 Tyree Wilson DE; 93 Byron Young DT	Linebackers (LB): 36 Curtis Bolton OLB; 56 Amari Burney OLB; 5 Divine Deablo OLB; 59 Luke Masterson OLB; 41 Robert Spillane MLB; Defensive backs (DB): 0 Jakorian Bennett CB; 1 Marcus Epps SS; 31 Brandon Facyson CB; 37 Tyler Hall CB; 39 Nate Hobbs CB; 18 Jack Jones CB; 25 Trevon Moehrig FS; 20 Isaiah Pola-Mao FS; 21 Amik Robertson CB; 29 Chris Smith II SS; Special teams (ST): 50 Jacob Bobenmoyer LS; 2 Daniel Carlson K; 6 A. J. Cole III P	Practice squad: 62 David Ebuka Agoha DE (IPP); 30 Cornell Armstrong CB; 84 Keelan Cole WR; 76 D. J. Fluker T; 85 Cole Fotheringham TE (PS/I); 40 Jaydon Grant SS; 82 E. J. Jenkins TE; 96 Marquan McCall DT; 47 Sincere McCormick RB; 73 Jalen McKenzie T; 54 Netane Muti G; 86 John Samuel Shenker TE; 99 Nesta Jade Silvera DT; 92 Elerson Smith OLB; 49 Charles Snowden DE; 26 Sam Webb CB; 83 Kristian Wilkerson WR; Reserve: 38 Brittain Brown RB (IR); 58 Darien Butler OLB (IR); 80 Jesper Horsted TE (IR); 43 Kana'i Mauga OLB (IR); 87 Michael Mayer TE (IR); 78 Dalton Wagner T (IR); 32 Austin Walter RB (IR); Rookies in italics 53 active, 7 reserve, 15 practice squad (2 exempt)

== Preseason ==
Week	Date	Opponent	Result	Record	Venue	Recap
1	August 13	San Francisco 49ers	W 34–7	1–0	Allegiant Stadium	Recap
2	August 19	at Los Angeles Rams	W 34–17	2–0	SoFi Stadium	Recap
3	August 26	at Dallas Cowboys	L 16–31	2–1	AT&T Stadium	Recap

== Regular season ==
=== Schedule ===
Week	Date	Opponent	Result	Record	Venue	Recap
1	September 10	at **Denver Broncos**	**W** 17–16	1–0	Empower Field at Mile High	Recap
2	September 17	at Buffalo Bills	**L** 10–38	1–1	Highmark Stadium	Recap
3	September 24	Pittsburgh Steelers	**L** 18–23	1–2	Allegiant Stadium	Recap
4	October 1	at **Los Angeles Chargers**	**L** 17–24	1–3	SoFi Stadium	Recap
5	October 9	Green Bay Packers	**W** 17–13	2–3	Allegiant Stadium	Recap
6	October 15	New England Patriots	**W** 21–17	3–3	Allegiant Stadium	Recap
7	October 22	at Chicago Bears	**L** 12–30	3–4	Soldier Field	Recap
8	October 30	at Detroit Lions	**L** 14–26	3–5	Ford Field	Recap
9	November 5	New York Giants	**W** 30–6	4–5	Allegiant Stadium	Recap
10	November 12	New York Jets	**W** 16–12	5–5	Allegiant Stadium	Recap
11	November 19	at Miami Dolphins	**L** 13–20	5–6	Hard Rock Stadium	Recap
12	November 26	**Kansas City Chiefs**	**L** 17–31	5–7	Allegiant Stadium	Recap
13	Bye					
14	December 10	Minnesota Vikings	**L** 0–3	5–8	Allegiant Stadium	Recap
15	December 14	**Los Angeles Chargers**	**W** 63–21	6–8	Allegiant Stadium	Recap
16	December 25	at **Kansas City Chiefs**	**W** 20–14	7–8	Arrowhead Stadium	Recap
17	December 31	at Indianapolis Colts	**L** 20–23	7–9	Lucas Oil Stadium	Recap
18	January 7	**Denver Broncos**	**W** 27–14	8–9	Allegiant Stadium	Recap

Note: Intra-division opponents are in bold text.

=== Game summaries ===
==== Week 1: at Denver Broncos ====
Week 1: Las Vegas Raiders at Denver Broncos – Game summary

Quarter	1	2	3	4	Total
**Raiders**	7	3	0	7	**17**
Broncos	6	7	0	3	**16**

at Empower Field at Mile High, Denver, Colorado

- Date: September 10
- Game time: 2:25 p.m. MDT/1:25 p.m. PDT
- Game weather: Cloudy, 64 °F (18 °C)
- Game attendance: 76,299
- Referee: Bill Vinovich
- TV announcers (CBS): Tom McCarthy, James Lofton, Jay Feely and Tiffany Blackmon
- Recap, Game Book

Game information

**First quarter**

- LV – Jakobi Meyers 3-yard pass from Jimmy Garoppolo (Daniel Carlson kick), 9:28. Raiders 7–0. **Drive: 10 plays, 44 yards, 5:32.**
- DEN – Lil'Jordan Humphrey 5-yard pass from Russell Wilson (kick failed), 0:44. Raiders 7–6. **Drive: 14 plays, 86 yards, 8:44.**

**Second quarter**

- LV – Daniel Carlson 24-yard field goal, 10:54. Raiders 10–6. **Drive: 10 plays, 70 yards, 4:50.**
- DEN – Courtland Sutton 5-yard pass from Russell Wilson (Wil Lutz kick), 0:12. Broncos 13–10. **Drive: 9 plays, 75 yards, 2:18.**

**Third quarter**

- No scoring plays.

**Fourth quarter**

- DEN – Wil Lutz 24-yard field goal, 8:54. Broncos 16–10. **Drive: 16 plays, 75 yards, 8:07.**
- LV – Jakobi Meyers 6-yard pass from Jimmy Garoppolo (Daniel Carlson kick), 6:34. Raiders 17–16. **Drive: 6 plays, 75 yards, 2:20.**

**Top passers**

- LV – Jimmy Garoppolo – 20/26, 200 yards, 2 TD, INT
- DEN – Russell Wilson – 27/34, 177 yards, 2 TD

**Top rushers**

- LV – Josh Jacobs – 19 rushes, 48 yards
- DEN – Javonte Williams – 13 rushes, 52 yards

**Top receivers**

- LV – Jakobi Meyers – 9 receptions, 81 yards, 2 TD
- DEN – Samaje Perine – 4 receptions, 37 yards

To commence their 2023 season, as well as the post-Derek Carr era, the Las Vegas Raiders traveled to Empower Field at Mile High to face one of their longtime AFC West rivals, the Denver Broncos. It took newly acquired Raiders quarterback Jimmy Garoppolo only one drive and 3 passes to pass a touchdown, as he hit Jakobi Meyers with a 3-yard touchdown pass to put the Raiders up, 7–0. Less than a minute later, Russell Wilson hit Lil'Jordan Humphrey with a 5-yard touchdown pass to cut the Raiders' lead to 7–6, since they couldn't get the extra point.

In the second quarter, Daniel Carlson booted a 24-yard field goal to push the Raiders' lead up to 10–6. However, Vegas trailed for the first time when Russell Wilson hit Courtland Sutton with a 5-yard touchdown pass to put Denver up, 13–10, at the half.

In the third quarter, neither team could score any points; the score stayed 13–10 in favor of the Broncos.

In the fourth quarter, Wil Lutz booted a 24-yard field goal and extended the Broncos' lead to 16–10. However, the Raiders would respond with Garoppolo hitting Jakobi Meyers with a 6-yard touchdown pass for a final score of 17–16.

With the win, the Raiders started the season 1–0, and were the only AFC West team that won their season opener.

==== Week 2: at Buffalo Bills ====
Week 2: Las Vegas Raiders at Buffalo Bills – Game summary

Quarter	1	2	3	4	Total
Raiders	7	3	0	0	**10**
**Bills**	7	14	7	10	**38**

at Highmark Stadium, Orchard Park, New York

- Date: September 17
- Game time: 1:00 p.m. EDT/10:00 a.m. PDT
- Game weather: Partly cloudy, 70 °F (21 °C)
- Game attendance: 70,772
- Referee: Craig Wrolstad
- TV announcers (CBS): Kevin Harlan, Trent Green and Melanie Collins
- Recap, Game Book

Game information

**First quarter**

- LV – Davante Adams 16-yard pass from Jimmy Garoppolo (Daniel Carlson kick), 12:16. Raiders 7–0. **Drive: 5 plays, 75 yards, 2:44.**
- BUF – Latavius Murray 4-yard run (Tyler Bass kick), 4:19. Tied 7–7. **Drive: 7 plays, 28 yards, 3:58.**

**Second quarter**

- BUF – Dawson Knox 2-yard pass from Josh Allen (Tyler Bass kick), 12:10. Bills 14–7. **Drive: 11 plays, 84 yards, 6:06.**
- LV – Daniel Carlson 47-yard field goal, 6:48. Bills 14–10. **Drive: 10 plays, 46 yards, 5:22.**
- BUF – Khalil Shakir 11-yard pass from Josh Allen (Tyler Bass kick), 0:18. Bills 21–10. **Drive: 8 plays, 57 yards, 1:29.**

**Third quarter**

- BUF – Gabe Davis 2-yard pass from Josh Allen (Tyler Bass kick), 5:59. Bills 28–10. **Drive: 15 plays, 75 yards, 9:01.**

**Fourth quarter**

- BUF – Tyler Bass 29-yard field goal, 14:56. Bills 31–10. **Drive: 9 plays, 37 yards, 3:53.**
- BUF – Damien Harris 1-yard run (Tyler Bass kick), 5:08. Bills 38–10. **Drive: 11 plays, 95 yards, 7:32.**

**Top passers**

- LV – Jimmy Garoppolo – 16/24, 185 yards, TD, 2 INT
- BUF – Josh Allen – 31/37, 274 yards, 3 TD

**Top rushers**

- LV – Tre Tucker – 1 rush, 34 yards
- BUF – James Cook – 17 rushes, 123 yards

**Top receivers**

- LV – Davante Adams – 6 receptions, 84 yards, TD
- BUF – Gabe Davis – 6 receptions, 92 yards, TD

==== Week 3: vs. Pittsburgh Steelers ====
Week 3: Pittsburgh Steelers at Las Vegas Raiders – Game summary

Quarter	1	2	3	4	Total
**Steelers**	7	6	10	0	**23**
Raiders	7	0	0	11	**18**

at Allegiant Stadium, Paradise, Nevada

- Date: September 24
- Game time: 5:20 p.m. PDT
- Game weather: None (indoor stadium)
- Game attendance: 62,541
- Referee: Tra Blake
- TV announcers (NBC): Mike Tirico, Cris Collinsworth and Melissa Stark
- Recap, Game Book

Game information

**First quarter**

- LV – Davante Adams 32-yard pass from Jimmy Garoppolo (Daniel Carlson kick), 7:04. Raiders 7–0. **Drive: 7 plays, 74 yards, 3:23.**
- PIT – Calvin Austin 72-yard pass from Kenny Pickett (Chris Boswell kick), 6:12. Tied 7–7. **Drive: 3 plays, 75 yards, 0:52.**

**Second quarter**

- PIT – Chris Boswell 43-yard field goal, 8:33. Steelers 10–7. **Drive: 8 plays, 44 yards, 3:51.**
- PIT – Chris Boswell 42-yard field goal, 1:56. Steelers 13–7. **Drive: 11 plays, 54 yards, 5:08.**

**Third quarter**

- PIT – Chris Boswell 57-yard field goal, 9:28. Steelers 16–7. **Drive: 9 plays, 52 yards, 4:29.**
- PIT – Pat Freiermuth 13-yard pass from Kenny Pickett (Chris Boswell kick), 3:56. Steelers 23–7. **Drive: 6 plays, 81 yards, 3:19.**

**Fourth quarter**

- LV – Davante Adams 1-yard pass from Jimmy Garoppolo (Michael Mayer pass from Jimmy Garoppolo), 5:41. Steelers 23–15. **Drive: 11 plays, 80 yards, 5:51.**
- LV – Daniel Carlson 26-yard field goal, 2:22. Steelers 23–18. **Drive: 9 plays, 44 yards, 2:13.**

**Top passers**

- PIT – Kenny Pickett – 16/28, 235 yards, 2 TD
- LV – Jimmy Garoppolo – 28/44, 324 yards, 2 TD, 3 INT

**Top rushers**

- PIT – Najee Harris – 19 rushes, 65 yards
- LV – Josh Jacobs – 17 rushes, 62 yards

**Top receivers**

- PIT – George Pickens – 4 receptions, 75 yards
- LV – Davante Adams – 13 receptions, 172 yards, 2 TD

==== Week 4: at Los Angeles Chargers ====
Week 4: Las Vegas Raiders at Los Angeles Chargers – Game summary

Quarter	1	2	3	4	Total
Raiders	7	0	3	7	**17**
**Chargers**	7	17	0	0	**24**

at SoFi Stadium, Inglewood, California

- Date: October 1
- Game time: 1:05 p.m. PDT
- Game weather: Partly cloudy, 67 °F (19 °C) (retractable roof open)
- Game attendance: 70,240
- Referee: John Hussey
- TV announcers (CBS): Kevin Harlan, Trent Green and Melanie Collins
- Recap, Game Book

Game information

**First quarter**

- LAC – Justin Herbert 12-yard run (Cameron Dicker kick), 10:38. Chargers 7–0. **Drive: 9 plays, 86 yards, 4:22.**
- LV – Aidan O'Connell 1-yard run (Daniel Carlson kick), 0:45. Tied 7–7. **Drive: 8 plays, 64 yards, 4:45.**

**Second quarter**

- LAC – Cameron Dicker 33-yard field goal, 10:42. Chargers 10–7. **Drive: 12 plays,60 yards, 5:03.**
- LAC – Keenan Allen 7-yard pass from Justin Herbert (Cameron Dicker kick), 7:20. Chargers 17–7. **Drive: 5 plays, 36 yards, 2:19.**
- LAC – Justin Herbert 1-yard run (Cameron Dicker kick), 3:05. Chargers 24–7. **Drive: 6 plays, 35 yards, 2:10.**

**Third quarter**

- LV – Daniel Carlson 22-yard field goal, 4:51. Chargers 24–10. **Drive: 13 plays, 49 yards, 6:29.**

**Fourth quarter**

- LV – Josh Jacobs 1-yard run (Daniel Carlson kick), 3:59. Chargers 24–17. **Drive: 12 plays,60 yards, 4:29.**

**Top passers**

- LV – Aidan O'Connell – 24/39, 238 yards, INT
- LAC – Justin Herbert – 13/24, 167 yards, TD, INT

**Top rushers**

- LV – Josh Jacobs – 17 rushes, 58 yards, TD
- LAC – Joshua Kelley – 17 rushes, 65 yards

**Top receivers**

- LV – Josh Jacobs – 8 receptions, 81 yards
- LAC – Joshua Palmer – 3 receptions, 77 yards

==== Week 5: vs. Green Bay Packers ====
Week 5: Green Bay Packers at Las Vegas Raiders – Game summary

Quarter	1	2	3	4	Total
Packers	3	0	10	0	**13**
**Raiders**	0	10	0	7	**17**

at Allegiant Stadium, Paradise, Nevada

- Date: October 9
- Game time: 5:15 p.m. PDT
- Game weather: None (indoor stadium)
- Game attendance: 62,572
- Referee: Brad Allen
- TV announcers (ESPN/ABC): Joe Buck, Troy Aikman and Lisa Salters
- Recap, Game Book

Game information

**First quarter**

- GB – Anders Carlson 37-yard field goal, 2:38. Packers 3–0. **Drive: 8 plays, 75 yards, 3:52.**

**Second quarter**

- LV – Jakobi Meyers 9-yard pass from Jimmy Garoppolo (Daniel Carlson kick), 4:09. Raiders 7–3. **Drive: 14 plays, 62 yards, 8:28.**
- LV – Daniel Carlson 26-yard field goal, 2:32. Raiders 10–3. **Drive: 4 plays, -1 yards, 1:28.**

**Third quarter**

- GB – A. J. Dillon 5-yard run (Anders Carlson kick), 8:27. Tied 10–10. **Drive: 8 plays, 37 yards, 4:22.**
- GB – Anders Carlson 22-yard field goal, 5:16. Packers 13–10. **Drive: 5 plays, 79 yards, 1:59.**

**Fourth quarter**

- LV – Josh Jacobs 1-yard run (Daniel Carlson kick), 14:56. Raiders 17–13. **Drive: 10 plays, 75 yards, 5:20.**

**Top passers**

- GB – Jordan Love – 16/30, 182 yards, 3 INT
- LV – Jimmy Garoppolo – 22/31, 208 yards, TD, INT

**Top rushers**

- GB – A. J. Dillon – 20 rushes, 76 yards, TD
- LV – Josh Jacobs – 20 rushes, 69 yards, TD

**Top receivers**

- GB – Christian Watson – 3 receptions, 91 yards
- LV – Jakobi Meyers – 7 receptions, 75 yards, TD

The Raiders snap their eight-game losing streak to the Packers, beating them for the first time since the 1987 season when the team was based in Los Angeles.

==== Week 6: vs. New England Patriots ====
Week 6: New England Patriots at Las Vegas Raiders – Game summary

Quarter	1	2	3	4	Total
Patriots	0	3	7	7	**17**
**Raiders**	3	10	3	5	**21**

at Allegiant Stadium, Paradise, Nevada

- Date: October 15
- Game time: 1:05 p.m. PDT
- Game weather: None (indoor stadium)
- Referee: Brad Rogers
- TV announcers (CBS): Jim Nantz, Tony Romo and Tracy Wolfson
- Recap, Game Book

Game information

**First quarter**

- LV – Daniel Carlson 25-yard field goal, 6:54. Raiders 3–0. **Drive: 16 plays, 69 yards, 8:06.**

**Second quarter**

- LV – Jakobi Meyers 12-yard pass from Jimmy Garoppolo (Daniel Carlson kick), 12:22. Raiders 10–0. **Drive: 8 plays, 59 yards, 4:14.**
- NE – Chad Ryland 43-yard field goal, 8:38. Raiders 10–3. **Drive: 9 plays, 57 yards, 3:44.**
- LV – Daniel Carlson 37-yard field goal, 0:10. Raiders 13–3. **Drive: 10 plays, 47 yards, 3:26.**

**Third quarter**

- NE – Ezekiel Elliott 2-yard run (Chad Ryland kick), 8:56. Raiders 13–10. **Drive: 10 plays, 75 yards, 6:04.**
- LV – Daniel Carlson 30-yard field goal, 3:55. Raiders 16–10. **Drive: 10 plays, 63 yards, 5:01.**

**Fourth quarter**

- LV – Daniel Carlson 24-yard field goal, 13:03. Raiders 19–10. **Drive: 9 plays, 59 yards, 4:24.**
- NE – Rhamondre Stevenson 1-yard run (Chad Ryland kick), 3:33. Raiders 19–17. **Drive: 17 plays, 75 yards, 9:30.**
- LV – Mac Jones sacked in end zone for a Safety, 1:47. Raiders 21–17.

**Top passers**

- NE – Mac Jones – 24/33, 200 yards, INT
- LV – Jimmy Garoppolo – 14/22, 162 yards, TD, INT

**Top rushers**

- NE – Rhamondre Stevenson – 10 rushes, 46 yards, TD
- LV – Josh Jacobs – 25 rushes, 77 yards

**Top receivers**

- NE – Kendrick Bourne – 10 receptions, 89 yards
- LV – Michael Mayer – 5 receptions, 75 yards

==== Week 7: at Chicago Bears ====
Week 7: Las Vegas Raiders at Chicago Bears – Game summary

Quarter	1	2	3	4	Total
Raiders	0	3	0	9	**12**
**Bears**	7	7	7	9	**30**

at Soldier Field, Chicago, Illinois

- Date: October 22
- Game time: 12:00 p.m. CDT/10:00 a.m. PDT
- Game weather: Partly cloudy, 52 °F (11 °C)
- Game attendance: 62,199
- Referee: Clay Martin
- TV announcers (Fox): Kevin Kugler, Mark Sanchez and Laura Okmin
- Recap, Game Book

Game information

**First quarter**

- CHI – D'Onta Foreman 2-yard run (Cairo Santos kick), 3:45. Bears 7–0. **Drive: 12 plays, 69 yards, 6:22.**

**Second quarter**

- CHI – D'Onta Foreman 3-yard run (Cairo Santos kick), 7:31. Bears 14–0. **Drive: 6 plays, 34 yards, 2:48.**
- LV – Daniel Carlson 40-yard field goal, 1:47. Bears 14–3. **Drive: 13 plays, 54 yards, 5:44.**

**Third quarter**

- CHI – D'Onta Foreman 5-yard pass from Tyson Bagent (Cairo Santos kick), 4:04. Bears 21–3. **Drive: 15 plays, 88 yards, 8:16.**

**Fourth quarter**

- LV – Daniel Carlson 25-yard field goal, 12:20. Bears 21–6. **Drive: 15 plays, 69 yards, 6:44.**
- CHI – Cairo Santos 54-yard field goal, 5:46. Bears 24–6. **Drive: 12 plays, 37 yards, 6:34.**
- CHI – Jaylon Johnson 39-yard interception return (kick blocked), 5:36. Bears 30–6.
- LV – Jakobi Meyers 9-yard pass from Aidan O'Connell (pass failed), 1:10. Bears 30–12. **Drive: 8 plays, 60 yards, 2:22.**

**Top passers**

- LV – Brian Hoyer – 17/32, 129 yards, 2 INT
- CHI – Tyson Bagent – 21/29, 162 yards, TD

**Top rushers**

- LV – Josh Jacobs – 11 rushes, 35 yards
- CHI – D'Onta Foreman – 16 rushes, 89 yards, 2 TD

**Top receivers**

- LV – Davante Adams – 7 receptions, 57 yards
- CHI – D. J. Moore – 8 receptions, 54 yards

==== Week 8: at Detroit Lions ====
Week 8: Las Vegas Raiders at Detroit Lions – Game summary

Quarter	1	2	3	4	Total
Raiders	0	7	7	0	**14**
**Lions**	3	13	7	3	**26**

at Ford Field, Detroit, Michigan

- Date: October 30
- Game time: 8:15 p.m. EDT/5:15 p.m. PDT
- Game weather: None (indoor stadium)
- Game attendance: 66,774
- Referee: Clete Blakeman
- TV announcers (ESPN/ABC): Joe Buck, Troy Aikman and Lisa Salters
- Recap, Game Book

Game information

**First quarter**

- DET – Riley Patterson 44-yard field goal, 7:51. Lions 3–0. **Drive: 14 plays, 54 yards, 5:06.**

**Second quarter**

- DET – Riley Patterson 31-yard field goal, 12:23. Lions 6–0. **Drive: 10 plays, 36 yards, 7:09.**
- DET – Riley Patterson 33-yard field goal, 8:08. Lions 9–0. **Drive: 7 plays, 63 yards, 3:16.**
- LV – Josh Jacobs 3-yard run (Daniel Carlson kick), 2:56. Lions 9–7. **Drive: 10 plays, 75 yards, 5:12.**
- DET – Sam LaPorta 18-yard pass from Jared Goff (Riley Patterson kick), 0:27. Lions 16–7. **Drive: 9 plays, 79 yards, 2:29.**

**Third quarter**

- LV – Marcus Peters 75-yard interception return (Daniel Carlson kick), 11:32. Lions 16–14.
- DET – Jahmyr Gibbs 27-yard run (Riley Patterson kick), 3:13. Lions 23–14. **Drive: 2 plays, 51 yards, 0:49.**

**Fourth quarter**

- DET – Riley Patterson 52-yard field goal, 9:59. Lions 26–14. **Drive: 12 plays, 55 yards, 6:08.**

**Top passers**

- LV – Jimmy Garoppolo – 10/21, 126 yards, INT
- DET – Jared Goff – 26/37, 272 yards, TD, INT

**Top rushers**

- LV – Josh Jacobs – 15 rushes, 61 yards, TD
- DET – Jahmyr Gibbs – 26 rushes, 152 yards, TD

**Top receivers**

- LV – Josh Jacobs – 2 receptions, 27 yards
- DET – Amon-Ra St. Brown – 6 receptions, 108 yards

==== Week 9: vs. New York Giants ====
Week 9: New York Giants at Las Vegas Raiders – Game summary

Quarter	1	2	3	4	Total
Giants	0	0	0	6	**6**
**Raiders**	7	17	3	3	**30**

at Allegiant Stadium, Paradise, Nevada

- Date: November 5
- Game time: 1:25 p.m. PST
- Game weather: None (indoor stadium)
- Game attendance: 62,082
- Referee: Alan Eck
- TV announcers (Fox): Kevin Kugler, Mark Sanchez and Laura Okmin
- Recap, Game Book

Game information

**First quarter**

- LV – Jakobi Meyers 17-yard run (Daniel Carlson kick), 9:45. Raiders 7–0. **Drive: 6 plays, 67 yards, 3:50.**

**Second quarter**

- LV – Josh Jacobs 2-yard run (Daniel Carlson kick), 5:06. Raiders 14–0. **Drive: 8 plays, 65 yards, 4:02.**
- LV – Josh Jacobs 1-yard run (Daniel Carlson kick), 1:57. Raiders 21–0. **Drive: 4 plays, 60 yards, 1:39.**
- LV – Daniel Carlson 24-yard field goal, 0:04. Raiders 24–0. **Drive: 6 plays, 20 yards, 1:41.**

**Third quarter**

- NYG – Wan'Dale Robinson 9-yard pass from Tommy DeVito (pass failed), 14:11. Raiders 27–6. **Drive: 11 plays, 84 yards, 5:53.**

**Fourth quarter**

- LV – Daniel Carlson 41-yard field goal, 9:29. Raiders 30–6. **Drive: 4 plays, 5 yards, 0:53.**

**Top passers**

- NYG – Tommy DeVito – 15/20, 175 yards, TD, 2 INT
- LV – Aidan O'Connell – 16/25, 209 yards

**Top rushers**

- NYG – Saquon Barkley – 16 rushes, 90 yards
- LV – Josh Jacobs – 26 rushes, 98 yards, 2 TD

**Top receivers**

- NYG – Darius Slayton – 4 receptions, 59 yards
- LV – Davante Adams - 4 reception, 34 yards

==== Week 10: vs. New York Jets ====
Week 10: New York Jets at Las Vegas Raiders – Game summary

Quarter	1	2	3	4	Total
Jets	6	3	0	3	**12**
**Raiders**	3	3	3	7	**16**

at Allegiant Stadium, Paradise, Nevada

- Date: November 12
- Game time: 5:20 p.m. PST
- Game weather: None (indoor stadium)
- Game attendance: 62,383
- Referee: Shawn Hochuli
- TV announcers (NBC): Mike Tirico, Cris Collinsworth and Melissa Stark
- Recap, Game Book

Game information

**First quarter**

- NYJ – Greg Zuerlein 47-yard field goal, 10:13. Jets 3–0. **Drive: 8 plays, 49 yards, 3:13.**
- LV – Daniel Carlson 41-yard field goal, 6:15. Tied 3–3. **Drive: 6 plays, 53 yards, 3:58.**
- NYJ – Greg Zuerlein 53-yard field goal, 1:11. Jets 6–3. **Drive: 9 plays, 40 yards, 5:04.**

**Second quarter**

- NYJ – Greg Zuerlein 30-yard field goal, 11:48. Jets 9–3. **Drive: 8 plays, 14 yards, 3:39.**
- LV – Daniel Carlson 54-yard field goal, 0:00. Jets 9–6. **Drive: 8 plays, 44 yards, 0:52.**

**Third quarter**

- LV – Daniel Carlson 40-yard field goal, 2:36. Tied 9–9. **Drive: 11 plays, 23 yards, 6:12.**

**Fourth quarter**

- LV – Michael Mayer 7-yard pass from Aidan O'Connell (Daniel Carlson kick), 14:10. Raiders 16–9. **Drive: 5 plays, 53 yards, 1:36.**
- NYJ – Greg Zuerlein 45-yard field goal, 11:58. Raiders 16–12. **Drive: 6 plays, 48 yards, 2:12.**

**Top passers**

- NYJ – Zach Wilson – 23/39, 263 yards, INT
- LV – Aidan O'Connell – 16/27, 153 yards, TD, INT

**Top rushers**

- NYJ – Zach Wilson – 4 rushes, 54 yards
- LV – Josh Jacobs – 27 rushes, 116 yards

**Top receivers**

- NYJ – Garrett Wilson – 9 receptions, 93 yards
- LV – Davante Adams - 6 receptions, 86 yards

==== Week 11: at Miami Dolphins ====
Week 11: Las Vegas Raiders at Miami Dolphins – Game summary

Quarter	1	2	3	4	Total
Raiders	10	3	0	0	**13**
**Dolphins**	7	7	6	0	**20**

at Hard Rock Stadium, Miami Gardens, Florida

- Date: November 19
- Game time: 1:00 p.m. EST/10:00 a.m. PST
- Game weather: Partly cloudy, 82 °F (28 °C)
- Game attendance: 66,026
- Referee: Bill Vinovich
- TV announcers (CBS): Kevin Harlan, Trent Green and Melanie Collins
- Recap, Game Book

Game information

**First quarter**

- LV – Daniel Carlson 34-yard field goal, 6:41. Raiders 3–0. **Drive: 7 plays, 14 yards, 4:17.**
- MIA – Tyreek Hill 38-yard pass from Tua Tagovailoa (Jason Sanders kick), 2:03. Dolphins 7–3. **Drive: 8 plays, 75 yards, 4:38.**
- LV – Davante Adams 46-yard pass from Aidan O'Connell (Daniel Carlson kick), 0:01. Raiders 10–7. **Drive: 4 plays, 75 yards, 2:02.**

**Second quarter**

- MIA – Salvon Ahmed 11-yard pass from Tua Tagovailoa (Jason Sanders kick), 2:28. Dolphins 14–10. **Drive: 9 plays, 63 yards, 5:03.**
- LV – Daniel Carlson 47-yard field goal, 0:05. Dolphins 14–13. **Drive: 4 plays, 3 yards, 0:53.**

**Third quarter**

- MIA – Jason Sanders 41-yard field goal, 5:26. Dolphins 17–13. **Drive: 7 plays, 30 yards, 2:47.**
- MIA – Jason Sanders 51-yard field goal, 0:25. Dolphins 20–13. **Drive: 8 plays, 52 yards, 3:27.**

**Fourth quarter**

- No scoring plays.

**Top passers**

- LV – Aidan O'Connell – 24/41, 271 yards, TD, 3 INT
- MIA – Tua Tagovailoa – 28/39, 325 yards, 2 TD, INT

**Top rushers**

- LV – Josh Jacobs – 14 rushes, 39 yards
- MIA – Raheem Mostert – 22 rushes, 86 yards

**Top receivers**

- LV – Davante Adams – 7 receptions, 82 yards, TD
- MIA – Tyreek Hill – 10 receptions, 146 yards, TD

==== Week 12: vs. Kansas City Chiefs ====
Week 12: Kansas City Chiefs at Las Vegas Raiders – Game summary

Quarter	1	2	3	4	Total
**Chiefs**	0	14	7	10	**31**
Raiders	7	7	3	0	**17**

at Allegiant Stadium, Paradise, Nevada

- Date: November 26
- Game time: 1:25 p.m. PST
- Game weather: None (indoor stadium)
- Game attendance: 62,441
- Referee: Land Clark
- TV announcers (CBS): Kevin Harlan, Trent Green and Melanie Collins
- Recap, Game Book

Game information

**First quarter**

- LV – Jakobi Meyers 18-yard pass from Aidan O'Connell (Daniel Carlson kick), 9:32. Raiders 7–0. **Drive: 9 plays, 75 yards, 5:28.**

**Second quarter**

- LV – Josh Jacobs 63-yard run (Daniel Carlson kick), 12:41. Raiders 14–0. **Drive: 2 plays, 77 yards, 0:42.**
- KC – Isiah Pacheco 1-yard run (Harrison Butker kick), 6:38. Raiders 14–7. **Drive: 12 plays, 71 yards, 6:03.**
- KC – Justin Watson 3-yard pass from Patrick Mahomes (Harrison Butker kick), 0:25. Tied 14–14. **Drive: 8 plays, 79 yards, 3:12.**

**Third quarter**

- KC – Isiah Pacheco 1-yard run (Harrison Butker kick), 9:15. Chiefs 21–14. **Drive: 10 plays, 75 yards, 5:45.**
- LV – Daniel Carlson 34-yard field goal, 2:09. Chiefs 21–17. **Drive: 8 plays, 60 yards, 4:05.**

**Fourth quarter**

- KC – Rashee Rice 39-yard pass from Patrick Mahomes (Harrison Butker kick), 13:40. Chiefs 28–17. **Drive: 6 plays, 75 yards, 3:29.**
- KC – Harrison Butker 32-yard field goal, 3:11. Chiefs 31–17. **Drive: 6 plays, 3 yards, 2:18.**

**Top passers**

- KC – Patrick Mahomes – 27/34, 298 yards, 2 TD
- LV – Aidan O'Connell – 23/33, 248 yards, TD

**Top rushers**

- KC – Isiah Pacheco – 15 rushes, 55 yards, 2 TD
- LV – Josh Jacobs – 20 rushes, 110 yards, TD

**Top receivers**

- KC – Rashee Rice – 8 receptions, 107 yards, TD
- LV – Jakobi Meyers – 6 receptions, 79 yards, TD

==== Week 14: vs. Minnesota Vikings ====
Week 14: Minnesota Vikings at Las Vegas Raiders – Game summary

Quarter	1	2	3	4	Total
**Vikings**	0	0	0	3	**3**
Raiders	0	0	0	0	**0**

at Allegiant Stadium, Paradise, Nevada

- Date: December 10
- Game time: 1:05 p.m. PST
- Game weather: None (indoor stadium)
- Game attendance: 62,626
- Referee: Craig Wrolstad
- TV announcers (Fox): Kevin Kugler, Mark Sanchez and Laura Okmin
- Recap, Game Book

Game information

**First quarter**

- No scoring plays.

**Second quarter**

- No scoring plays.

**Third quarter**

- No scoring plays.

**Fourth quarter**

- MIN – Greg Joseph 36-yard field goal, 1:57. Vikings 3–0. **Drive: 13 plays, 56 yards, 3:22.**

**Top passers**

- MIN – Nick Mullens – 9/13, 83 yards
- LV – Aidan O'Connell – 21/32, 171 yards, INT

**Top rushers**

- MIN – Alexander Mattison – 10 rushes, 66 yards
- LV – Josh Jacobs – 13 rushes, 34 yards

**Top receivers**

- MIN – T. J. Hockenson – 5 receptions, 53 yards
- LV – Davante Adams – 7 receptions, 53 yards

==== Week 15: vs. Los Angeles Chargers ====
Week 15: Los Angeles Chargers at Las Vegas Raiders – Game summary

Quarter	1	2	3	4	Total
Chargers	0	0	7	14	**21**
**Raiders**	21	21	14	7	**63**

at Allegiant Stadium, Paradise, Nevada

- Date: December 14
- Game time: 5:15 p.m. PST
- Game weather: None (indoor stadium)
- Game attendance: 61,654
- Referee: Ronald Torbert
- TV announcers (KTNV/Prime Video): Al Michaels, Kirk Herbstreit and Kaylee Hartung
- Recap, Game Book

Game information

**First quarter**

- LV – Zamir White 1-yard run (Daniel Carlson kick), 8:10. Raiders 7–0. **Drive: 12 plays, 68 yards, 5:23.**
- LV – Tre Tucker 30-yard pass from Aidan O'Connell (Daniel Carlson kick), 4:41. Raiders 14–0. **Drive: 4 plays, 42 yards, 1:26.**
- LV – Jakobi Meyers 22-yard pass from Aidan O'Connell (Daniel Carlson kick), 3:07. Raiders 21–0. **Drive: 3 plays, 31 yards, 1:29.**

**Second quarter**

- LV – Michael Mayer 11-yard pass from Aidan O'Connell (Daniel Carlson kick), 9:15. Raiders 28–0. **Drive: 2 plays, 14 yards, 0:29.**
- LV – Brandon Bolden 26-yard run (Daniel Carlson kick), 3:50. Raiders 35–0. **Drive: 6 plays, 65 yards, 3:31.**
- LV – Tre Tucker 20-yard pass from Aidan O'Connell (Daniel Carlson kick), 0:31. Raiders 42–0. **Drive: 6 plays, 49 yards, 1:25.**

**Third quarter**

- LV – Davante Adams 3-yard pass from Jakobi Meyers (Daniel Carlson kick), 10:42. Raiders 49–0. **Drive: 9 plays, 75 yards, 4:18.**
- LAC – Josh Palmer 79-yard pass from Easton Stick (Cameron Dicker kick), 10:27. Raiders 49–7. **Drive: 1 play, 79 yards, 0:15.**
- LV – John Jenkins 44-yard fumble return (Daniel Carlson kick), 0:00. Raiders 56–7.

**Fourth quarter**

- LV – Jack Jones 16-yard interception return (Daniel Carlson kick), 14:31. Raiders 63–7.
- LAC – Alex Erickson 13-yard pass from Easton Stick (Cameron Dicker kick), 8:39. Raiders 63–14. **Drive: 11 plays, 75 yards, 5:52.**
- LAC – Quentin Johnston 6-yard pass from Easton Stick (Cameron Dicker kick), 2:38. Raiders 63–21. **Drive: 10 plays, 55 yards, 4:15.**

**Top passers**

- LAC – Easton Stick – 23/32, 257 yards, 3 TD, INT
- LV – Aidan O'Connell – 20/34, 248 yards, 4 TD

**Top rushers**

- LAC – Isaiah Spiller – 16 rushes, 50 yards
- LV – Zamir White – 17 rushes, 69 yards, TD

**Top receivers**

- LAC – Josh Palmer – 4 receptions, 113 yards, TD
- LV – Davante Adams – 8 receptions, 101 yards, TD

Aidan O'Connell threw four touchdowns in the Raiders’ largest franchise points output ever in a 63–21 win over the Chargers. The Raiders forced five turnovers and receiver Jakobi Meyers threw a touchdown as the Raiders led 42–0 at the half. The previous high for points scored had been 59 against the Broncos in 2010. The final score (63–21) was a scorigami.

==== Week 16: at Kansas City Chiefs ====
Christmas Day games

Week 16: Las Vegas Raiders at Kansas City Chiefs – Game summary

Quarter	1	2	3	4	Total
**Raiders**	3	14	3	0	**20**
Chiefs	0	7	0	7	**14**

at Arrowhead Stadium, Kansas City, Missouri

- Date: December 25
- Game time: 12:00 p.m. CST/10:00 a.m. PST
- Game weather: 38 °F (3 °C)
- Game attendance: 73,480
- Referee: Clete Blakeman
- TV announcers (CBS/Nick): Jim Nantz, Tony Romo and Tracy Wolfson (CBS)
  Noah Eagle, Nate Burleson, Dylan Schefter, Brady Noon (as Raphael, and Micah Abbey (as Donatello (Nickelodeon)
- Recap, Game Book

Game information

**First quarter**

- LV – Daniel Carlson 24-yard field goal, 1:18. Raiders 3–0. **Drive: 15 plays, 87 yards, 4:44.**

**Second quarter**

- KC – Isiah Pacheco 12-yard run (Harrison Butker kick), 7:34. Chiefs 7–3. **Drive: 10 plays, 74 yards, 5:21.**
- LV – Bilal Nichols 8-yard fumble return (run failed), 4:55. Raiders 9–7.
- LV – Jack Jones 33-yard interception return (Brandon Bolden run), 4:48. Raiders 17–7.

**Third quarter**

- LV – Daniel Carlson 35-yard field goal, 0:24. Raiders 20–7. **Drive: 7 plays, 25 yards, 2:23.**

**Fourth quarter**

- KC – Justin Watson 7-yard pass from Patrick Mahomes (Harrison Butker kick), 2:42. Raiders 20–14. **Drive: 9 plays, 69 yards, 3:23.**

**Top passers**

- LV – Aidan O'Connell – 9/21, 62 yards
- KC – Patrick Mahomes – 27/44, 235 yards, TD, INT

**Top rushers**

- LV – Zamir White – 22 rushes, 145 yards
- KC – Patrick Mahomes – 10 rushes, 53 yards

**Top receivers**

- LV – Jakobi Meyers – 3 receptions, 42 yards
- KC – Rashee Rice – 6 receptions, 57 yards

With the upset win, the Raiders improved to 7-8 while also securing their first win over the Chiefs since 2020. As of 2025, this remains the Raiders last road win over a divisional foe.

==== Week 17: at Indianapolis Colts ====
Week 17: Las Vegas Raiders at Indianapolis Colts – Game summary

Quarter	1	2	3	4	Total
Raiders	3	0	7	10	**20**
**Colts**	7	7	3	6	**23**

at Lucas Oil Stadium, Indianapolis, Indiana

- Date: December 31
- Game time: 1:00 p.m. EST/10:00 a.m. PST
- Game weather: None (retractable roof closed)
- Game attendance: 65,538
- Referee: Shawn Smith
- TV announcers (CBS): Andrew Catalon, Tiki Barber, Matt Ryan and AJ Ross
- Recap, Game Book

Game information

**First quarter**

- IND – Jonathan Taylor 5-yard run (Matt Gay kick), 12:11. Colts 7–0. **Drive: 6 plays, 75 yards, 2:49.**
- LV – Daniel Carlson 40-yard field goal, 5:57. Colts 7–3. **Drive: 12 plays, 54 yards, 6:14.**

**Second quarter**

- IND – Alec Pierce 58-yard pass from Gardner Minshew (Matt Gay kick), 3:53. Colts 14–3. **Drive: 6 plays, 90 yards, 3:12.**

**Third quarter**

- LV – Davante Adams 4-yard pass from Aidan O'Connell (Daniel Carlson kick), 6:31. Colts 14–10. **Drive: 15 plays, 75 yards, 8:29.**
- IND – Matt Gay 38-yard field goal, 1:17. Colts 17–10. **Drive: 12 plays, 56 yards, 5:14.**

**Fourth quarter**

- IND – Matt Gay 33-yard field goal, 7:34. Colts 20–10. **Drive: 9 plays, 61 yards, 5:40.**
- LV – Daniel Carlson 33-yard field goal, 4:35. Colts 20–13. **Drive: 11 plays, 60 yards, 2:59.**
- IND – Matt Gay 45-yard field goal, 3:11. Colts 23–13. **Drive: 7 plays, 48 yards, 1:24.**
- LV – Davante Adams 1-yard pass from Aidan O'Connell (Daniel Carlson kick), 0:43. Colts 23–20. **Drive: 9 plays, 75 yards, 2:28.**

**Top passers**

- LV – Aidan O'Connell – 30/47, 299 yards, 2 TD
- IND – Gardner Minshew – 15/23, 224 yards, TD

**Top rushers**

- LV – Zamir White – 20 rushes, 71 yards
- IND – Jonathan Taylor – 21 rushes, 96 yards, TD

**Top receivers**

- LV – Davante Adams – 13 receptions, 126 yards, 2 TD
- IND – Michael Pittman Jr. – 5 receptions, 46 yards

With the loss, the Raiders were once again eliminated from playoff contention for the second straight year. Las Vegas would also finished 2-6 on road.

==== Week 18: vs. Denver Broncos ====
Week 18: Denver Broncos at Las Vegas Raiders – Game summary

Quarter	1	2	3	4	Total
Broncos	0	7	0	7	**14**
**Raiders**	7	10	0	10	**27**

at Allegiant Stadium, Paradise, Nevada

- Date: January 7
- Game time: 1:25 p.m. PST
- Game weather: None (indoor stadium)
- Game attendance: 61,429
- Referee: Shawn Hochuli
- TV announcers (Fox): Jason Benetti, Matt Millen and Megan Olivi
- Recap, Game Book

Game information

**First quarter**

- LV – Jakobi Meyers 5-yard run (Daniel Carlson kick), 1:44. Raiders 7–0. **Drive: 13 plays, 78 yards, 8:03.**

**Second quarter**

- DEN – Jerry Jeudy 24-yard pass from Jarrett Stidham (Wil Lutz kick), 10:34. Tied 7–7. **Drive: 11 plays, 84 yards, 6:10.**
- LV – Daniel Carlson 49-yard field goal, 7:09. Raiders 10–7. **Drive: 8 plays, 44 yards, 3:25.**
- LV – Davante Adams 3-yard pass from Aidan O'Connell (Daniel Carlson kick), 0:07. Raiders 17–7. **Drive: 12 plays, 98 yards, 1:36.**

**Third quarter**

- No scoring plays.

**Fourth quarter**

- LV – Jakobi Meyers 33-yard pass from Aidan O'Connell (Daniel Carlson kick), 14:53. Raiders 24–7. **Drive: 6 plays, 63 yards, 3:32.**
- DEN – Javonte Williams 2-yard run (Wil Lutz kick), 10:09. Broncos 24–14. **Drive: 8 plays, 75 yards, 4:44.**
- LV – Daniel Carlson 21-yard field goal, 2:20. Raiders 27–14. **Drive: 15 plays, 72 yards, 7:49.**

**Top passers**

- DEN – Jarrett Stidham – 20/34, 272 yards, TD, INT
- LV – Aidan O'Connell – 20/31, 244 yards, 2 TD

**Top rushers**

- DEN – Javonte Williams – 9 rushes, 32 yards, TD
- LV – Zamir White – 25 rushes, 112 yards

**Top receivers**

- DEN – Javonte Williams – 7 receptions, 43 yards
- LV – Tre Tucker – 5 receptions, 79 yards

With the win, Las Vegas ended their season at 8-9, finishing 4-2 against the AFC West & 6-3 at home. However, as of 2025, this remains their last win over Denver as well their last divisional win until Week 18 of 2025.

=== Standings ===
==== Division ====
AFC West
	W	L	T	PCT	DIV	CONF	PF	PA	STK
^{(3)} Kansas City Chiefs	11	6	0	.647	4–2	9–3	371	294	W2
Las Vegas Raiders	8	9	0	.471	4–2	6–6	332	331	W1
Denver Broncos	8	9	0	.471	3–3	5–7	357	413	L1
Los Angeles Chargers	5	12	0	.294	1–5	3–9	346	398	L5

==== Conference ====
AFC
#	Team	Division	W	L	T	PCT	DIV	CONF	SOS	SOV	STK
**Division leaders**
1	Baltimore Ravens	North	13	4	0	.765	3–3	8–4	.543	.529	L1
2 (Note: Buffalo claimed the No. 2 seed over Kansas City based on head-to-head victory.) (Note: Buffalo finished ahead of Miami in the AFC East based on head-to-head sweep.)	Buffalo Bills	East	11	6	0	.647	4–2	7–5	.471	.471	W5
3	Kansas City Chiefs	West	11	6	0	.647	4–2	9–3	.481	.428	W2
4	Houston Texans	South	10	7	0	.588	4–2	7–5	.474	.465	W2
**Wild cards**
5 (Note: Cleveland claimed the No. 5 seed over Miami based on conference record.)	Cleveland Browns	North	11	6	0	.647	3–3	8–4	.536	.513	L1
6	Miami Dolphins	East	11	6	0	.647	4–2	7–5	.450	.358	L2
7	Pittsburgh Steelers	North	10	7	0	.588	5–1	7–5	.540	.571	W3
**Did not qualify for the postseason**
8 (Note: Cincinnati finished ahead of Jacksonville based on head-to-head victory. Division tie break was initially used to eliminate Indianapolis (see below).)	Cincinnati Bengals	North	9	8	0	.529	1–5	4–8	.574	.536	W1
9 (Note: Jacksonville finished ahead of Indianapolis based on head-to-head sweep.)	Jacksonville Jaguars	South	9	8	0	.529	4–2	6–6	.533	.477	L1
10	Indianapolis Colts	South	9	8	0	.529	3–3	7–5	.491	.444	L1
11 (Note: Las Vegas finished ahead of Denver based on head-to-head sweep.)	Las Vegas Raiders	West	8	9	0	.471	4–2	6–6	.488	.426	W1
12	Denver Broncos	West	8	9	0	.471	3–3	5–7	.488	.485	L1
13	New York Jets	East	7	10	0	.412	2–4	4–8	.502	.454	W1
14	Tennessee Titans	South	6	11	0	.353	1–5	4–8	.522	.422	W1
15	Los Angeles Chargers	West	5	12	0	.294	1–5	3–9	.529	.388	L5
16	New England Patriots	East	4	13	0	.235	2–4	4–8	.522	.529	L2
**Tiebreakers** (Note: When breaking ties for three or more teams under the NFL's rules, they are first broken within divisions, then comparing only the highest ranked remaining team from each division.)
