= 2024 Las Vegas Raiders season =

65th season in franchise history

- Owner: Mark Davis
- General manager: Tom Telesco
- Head coach: Antonio Pierce
- Home stadium: Allegiant Stadium

Results
- Record: 4–13
- Division place: 4th AFC West
- Playoffs: Did not qualify
- All-Pros: TE Brock Bowers (1st team)
- Pro Bowlers: TE Brock Bowers; DE Maxx Crosby

Uniform
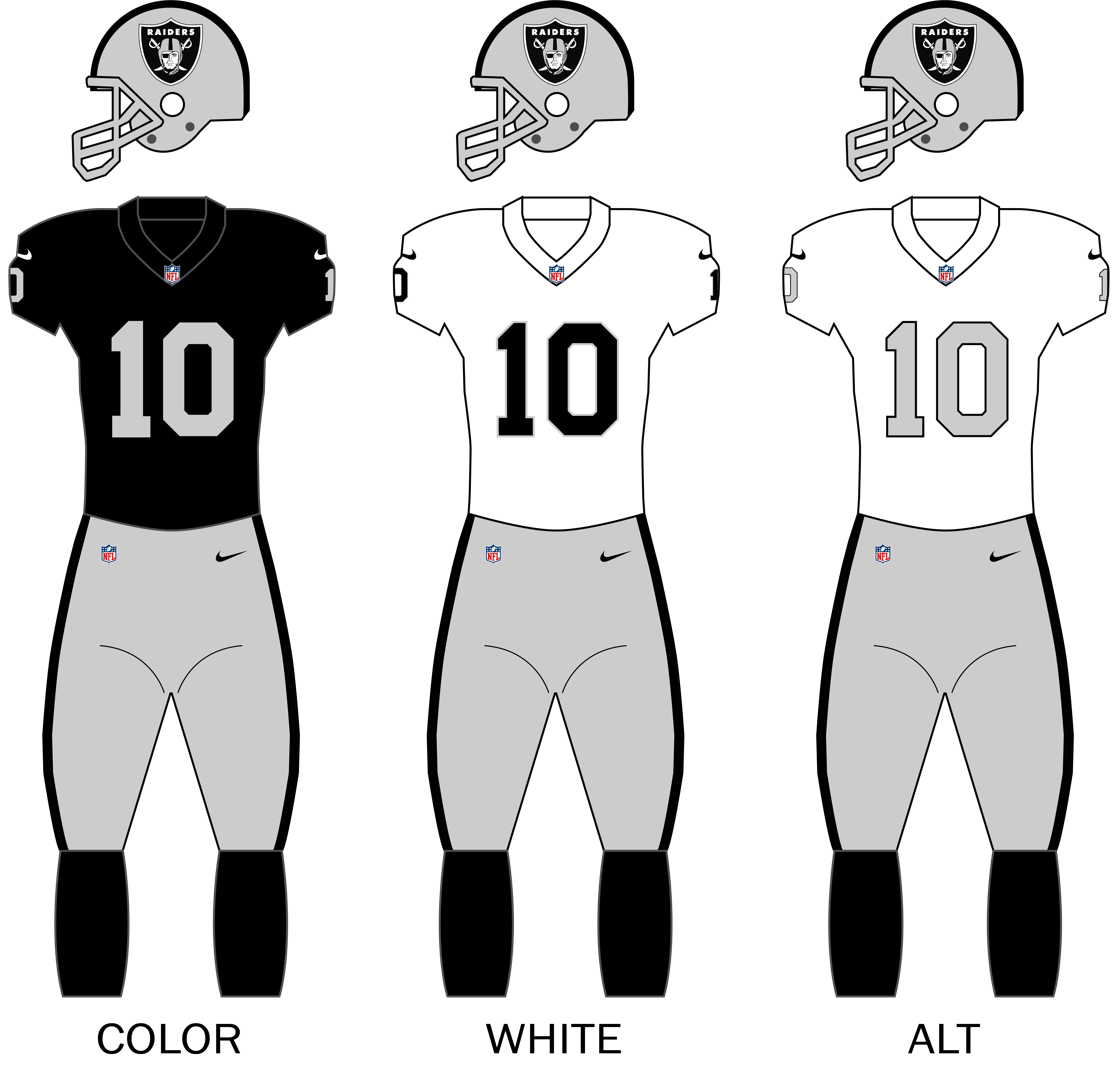

The 2024 season was the Las Vegas Raiders' 55th in the National Football League (NFL), their 65th overall, their fifth in Las Vegas, and their only season under the head coach/general manager tandem of Antonio Pierce and Tom Telesco. Unable to improve on their 8–9 record from 2023, the Raiders failed to qualify for the playoffs for the third consecutive season (and the 20th time in 22 seasons), and instead went 4–13 for their third consecutive losing season. Their .235 winning percentage was their poorest since 2014. It was their first season since 2018 when they were based in Oakland placing last in the AFC West.

The Raiders fired Pierce two days after the season ended. Two days later, Telesco was also fired. For the first time since 2006 when they were based in Oakland, the team did not win a single game against their AFC West opponents. On a brighter note, rookie tight end Brock Bowers broke Darren Waller's record for the most receptions in a season as a Raider with 112; the previous record was 107.

== Offseason ==
=== Coaching changes ===
On October 31, 2023, following a Week 8 loss to the Detroit Lions, the Raiders fired Josh McDaniels and general manager Dave Ziegler. The Raiders named linebackers coach Antonio Pierce interim head coach, and assistant general manager Champ Kelly interim general manager. Following the season, the team named Antonio Pierce the full-time head coach after the team finished the season with a record of 5–4 under Pierce. On January 23, 2024, Tom Telesco was hired as the general manager of the Raiders.

=== Notable free agent acquisitions ===
Position	Player	Age	2023 team
DT	Christian Wilkins	28	Miami Dolphins
QB	Gardner Minshew	28	Indianapolis Colts
C	Cody Whitehair	32	Chicago Bears

=== Notable players released ===
Position	Player	Age	2024 team
RB	Josh Jacobs	26	Green Bay Packers
QB	Jimmy Garoppolo	32	Los Angeles Rams

=== Trades ===
Date	Player(s)/Asset(s) received	Team	Player(s)/Asset(s) traded
October 16	2025 conditional selection (2nd round if Adams is first or second team All-Pro in 2024 or is on Jets active roster for AFC championship game or Super Bowl LIX; else 3rd round)	New York Jets	WR Davante Adams

=== Draft ===
2024 Las Vegas Raiders draft selections
Round	Selection	Player	Position	College	Notes
1	13	Brock Bowers	TE	Georgia	
2	44	Jackson Powers-Johnson	C	Oregon	
3	77	Delmar Glaze	OT	Maryland	
4	112	Decamerion Richardson	CB	Mississippi State	
5	148	Tommy Eichenberg	LB	Ohio State	
6	188	Traded to the New England Patriots (Note: The Raiders traded a sixth-round selection (188th overall) to the New England Patriots in exchange for a seventh-round selection (223rd overall) and OT Justin Herron.)			
6	208	Dylan Laube	RB	New Hampshire	From Chiefs (Note: The Raiders traded DT Neil Farrell Jr. to the Kansas City Chiefs in exchange for a sixth-round selection (208th overall).)
7	223	Trey Taylor	S	Air Force	From Patriots
7	229	M. J. Devonshire	CB	Pittsburgh	From Vikings (Note: The Raiders traded QB Nick Mullens to the Minnesota Vikings in exchange for a conditional seventh-round selection (229th overall).)
7	233	Traded to the Dallas Cowboys (Note: The Raiders traded a seventh-round selection (233rd overall) and DT Johnathan Hankins to the Dallas Cowboys in exchange for a 2023 sixth-round selection.)			

2024 Las Vegas Raiders undrafted free agents
Name	Position	College	Ref.
Carter Bradley	QB	South Alabama	
Clark Barrington	G	Baylor	
Andrew Coker	OT	TCU	
Jeff Foreman	WR	Arkansas State	
Tomari Fox	DT	North Carolina	
T. J. Franklin	DE	Baylor	
Amari Gainer	LB	North Carolina	
Demarcus Governor	CB	Northern Iowa	
Lideatrick Griffin	WR	Mississippi State	
Jake Johanning	G	Furman	
Ramel Keyton	WR	Tennessee	
Will Putnam	C	Clemson	
Phalen Sanford	S	Nebraska	
Noah Shannon	DT	Iowa	
Ja'Quan Sheppard	CB	Maryland	
Ron Stone	LB	Washington State	
Rayshad Williams	CB	Texas Tech	

Draft trades

== Staff ==
2024 Las Vegas Raiders staff
Front office: Owner – Mark and Carol Davis; President – Sandra Douglass Morgan; General manager – Tom Telesco; Assistant general manager – Champ Kelly; Senior vice president/director of football administration – Tom Delaney; VP, football research and development – David Christoff; Senior director of player personnel – JoJo Wooden; Director of football systems – Brad Goldsberry; Director of college scouting – Brandon Yeargan; Assistant director of pro scouting – Ben Chester; Senior personnel advisor – Shaun Herock; Senior national scouts – Lenny McGill, Dujuan Daniels, Andy Dengler; Head coaches: Head coach – Antonio Pierce; Assistant head coach – Marvin Lewis; Offensive coaches: Offensive coordinator - Luke Getsy (fired on November 5); Interim offensive coordinator - Scott Turner; Assistant quarterbacks – Fred Walker; Running backs – Cadillac Williams; Wide receivers – Edgar Bennett; Tight ends – Luke Steckel; Assistant tight ends – Mitch Singler; Interim offensive line – Joe Philbin; Offensive assistant – De'Andre Pierce; Senior advisor – Norv Turner; Assistant offense – Tim Zetts	Defensive coaches: Defensive coordinator – Patrick Graham; Senior defensive assistant – Rob Ryan; Defensive line – Rob Leonard; Linebackers/run game coordinator – Mike Caldwell; Assistant linebackers – Marcus Lewis; Cornerbacks – Ricky Manning; Safeties – Gerald Alexander; Assistant defensive backs – Matt Feeney; Pass rush specialist – Andre Carter; Assistant defense – Josh Phillips; Special teams coaches: Special teams coordinator – Tom McMahon; Assistant special teams – Kade Rannings; Assistant special teams – Derius Swinton II; Game management – Matt Sheldon; Strength and conditioning: Head strength and conditioning – A. J. Neibel; Strength and conditioning assistant – D'Anthony Batiste; Strength and conditioning assistant – Deuce Gruden; Strength and conditioning assistant – Rick Slate

== Final roster ==
2024 Las Vegas Raiders roster
Quarterbacks (QB): 14 Carter Bradley; 12 Aidan O'Connell; 10 Desmond Ridder; Running backs (RB): 8 Ameer Abdullah; 33 Chris Collier; 23 Dylan Laube; 22 Alexander Mattison; Wide receivers (WR): 82 Ramel Keyton; 80 Terrace Marshall Jr.; 16 Jakobi Meyers; 11 Tre Tucker; Tight ends (TE): 89 Brock Bowers; 84 Harrison Bryant; 87 Michael Mayer; 88 Justin Shorter	Offensive linemen (OL): 71 Delmar Glaze RT; 68 Andre James C; 61 Jordan Meredith LG; 74 Kolton Miller LT; 77 Thayer Munford RT; 66 Dylan Parham RG; 75 Andrus Peat LT; 58 Jackson Powers-Johnson C; 65 Cody Whitehair LG; Defensive linemen (DL): 69 Adam Butler DT; 91 Matthew Butler DT; 93 Zachary Carter DT; 99 Andre Carter II DE; 44 K'Lavon Chaisson DE; 95 John Jenkins DT; 96 Jonah Laulu DT; 49 Charles Snowden DE; 9 Tyree Wilson DE	Linebackers (LB): 56 Amari Burney OLB; 5 Divine Deablo OLB; 45 Tommy Eichenberg OLB; 53 Amari Gainer MLB; 43 Kana'i Mauga OLB; 41 Robert Spillane MLB; Defensive backs (DB): 34 Thomas Harper SS; 39 Nate Hobbs CB; 30 Darnay Holmes CB; 18 Jack Jones CB; 36 Kyu Blu Kelly CB; 7 Trevon Moehrig FS; 20 Isaiah Pola-Mao FS; 25 Decamerion Richardson CB; 29 Chris Smith II SS; 37 Trey Taylor FS; 27 Sam Webb CB; Special teams (ST): 50 Jacob Bobenmoyer LS; 2 Daniel Carlson K; 6 AJ Cole P	Practice squad: 55 David Agoha DE (IPP); 72 Gottlieb Ayedze LT; 81 Alex Bachman WR; 26 MJ Devonshire CB; 31 Keenan Isaac CB; 4 Shedrick Jackson WR; 13 Jake Luton QB; 92 Tyler Manoa DT; 32 Tyreik McAllister WR; 90 Ovie Oghoufo DE; 67 Will Putnam C; 86 John Samuel Shenker TE; 47 Brandon Smith LB; 35 Isaiah Spiller RB; 78 Dalton Wagner RT; 83 Kristian Wilkerson WR; Reserve: 0 Jakorian Bennett CB (IR); 98 Maxx Crosby DE (IR); 1 Marcus Epps SS (IR); 80 Jeff Foreman WR (IR); 60 Tomari Fox DT (IR); 51 Malcolm Koonce DE (IR); 59 Luke Masterson OLB (IR); 28 Sincere McCormick RB (IR); 15 Gardner Minshew QB (IR); 97 Janarius Robinson DE (Susp.); 19 D. J. Turner WR (IR); 3 Zamir White RB (IR); 94 Christian Wilkins DT (IR); Rookies in italics 53 active, 13 reserve, 15 practice squad (1 exempt)

== Preseason ==
The Raiders' preseason opponents and preliminary schedule were announced on May 15, in conjunction with the release of the regular season schedule. Final schedule was released on May 17.

Week	Date	Opponent	Result	Record	Venue	Recap
1	August 10	at Minnesota Vikings	L 23–24	0–1	U.S. Bank Stadium	Recap
2	August 17	Dallas Cowboys	L 12–27	0–2	Allegiant Stadium	Recap
3	August 23	San Francisco 49ers	T 24–24	0–2–1	Allegiant Stadium	Recap

== Regular season ==
=== Schedule ===
Week	Date	Opponent	Result	Record	Venue	Recap
1	September 8	at **Los Angeles Chargers**	**L** 10–22	0–1	SoFi Stadium	Recap
2	September 15	at Baltimore Ravens	**W** 26–23	1–1	M&T Bank Stadium	Recap
3	September 22	Carolina Panthers	**L** 22–36	1–2	Allegiant Stadium	Recap
4	September 29	Cleveland Browns	**W** 20–16	2–2	Allegiant Stadium	Recap
5	October 6	at **Denver Broncos**	**L** 18–34	2–3	Empower Field at Mile High	Recap
6	October 13	Pittsburgh Steelers	**L** 13–32	2–4	Allegiant Stadium	Recap
7	October 20	at Los Angeles Rams	**L** 15–20	2–5	SoFi Stadium	Recap
8	October 27	**Kansas City Chiefs**	**L** 20–27	2–6	Allegiant Stadium	Recap
9	November 3	at Cincinnati Bengals	**L** 24–41	2–7	Paycor Stadium	Recap
10	Bye					
11	November 17	at Miami Dolphins	**L** 19–34	2–8	Hard Rock Stadium	Recap
12	November 24	**Denver Broncos**	**L** 19–29	2–9	Allegiant Stadium	Recap
13	November 29	at **Kansas City Chiefs**	**L** 17–19	2–10	Arrowhead Stadium	Recap
14	December 8	at Tampa Bay Buccaneers	**L** 13–28	2–11	Raymond James Stadium	Recap
15	December 16	Atlanta Falcons	**L** 9–15	2–12	Allegiant Stadium	Recap
16	December 22	Jacksonville Jaguars	**W** 19–14	3–12	Allegiant Stadium	Recap
17	December 29	at New Orleans Saints	**W** 25–10	4–12	Caesars Superdome	Recap
18	January 5	**Los Angeles Chargers**	**L** 20–34	4–13	Allegiant Stadium	Recap

Note: Intra-division opponents are in bold text.

=== Game summaries ===
==== Week 1: at Los Angeles Chargers ====
Week 1: Las Vegas Raiders at Los Angeles Chargers – Game summary

Quarter	1	2	3	4	Total
Raiders	7	0	0	3	**10**
**Chargers**	3	3	3	13	**22**

at SoFi Stadium, Inglewood, California

- Date: September 8
- Game time: 1:05 p.m. PDT
- Game weather: Sunny, 97 °F (36 °C) (fixed roof)
- Game attendance: 70,240
- Referee: Scott Novak
- TV announcers (CBS): Jim Nantz, Tony Romo and Tracy Wolfson
- Recap, Game Book

Game information

**First quarter**

- LAC – Cameron Dicker 53-yard field goal, 4:22. Chargers 3–0. **Drive: 4 plays, 5 yards, 1:33.**
- LV – Alexander Mattison 31-yard pass from Gardner Minshew (Daniel Carlson kick), 0:45. Raiders 7–3. **Drive: 7 plays, 67 yards, 3:37.**

**Second quarter**

- LAC – Cameron Dicker 25-yard field goal, 0:26. Raiders 7–6. **Drive: 4 plays, 5 yards, 0:47.**

**Third quarter**

- LAC – Cameron Dicker 24-yard field goal, 9:08. Chargers 9–7. **Drive: 9 plays, 74 yards, 3:45.**

**Fourth quarter**

- LAC – J. K. Dobbins 12-yard rush (Cameron Dicker kick), Chargers 16–7. **Drive: 6 plays, 61 yards, 2:07.**
- LV – Daniel Carlson 32-yard field goal, 10:30. Chargers 16–10. **Drive: 8 plays, 56 yards, 4:25.**
- LAC – Ladd McConkey 10-yard pass from Justin Herbert (run failed), 3:40. Chargers 22–10. **Drive: 8 plays, 92 yards, 3:29.**

**Top passers**

- LV – Gardner Minshew – 25/33, 257 yards, TD, INT
- LAC – Justin Herbert – 17/26, 144 yards, TD

**Top rushers**

- LV – Zamir White – 13 rushes, 44 yards
- LAC – J. K. Dobbins – 10 rushes, 135 yards, TD

**Top receivers**

- LV – Jakobi Meyers – 3 receptions, 61 yards
- LAC – Ladd McConkey – 5 receptions, 39 yards, TD

==== Week 2: at Baltimore Ravens ====
Week 2: Las Vegas Raiders at Baltimore Ravens – Game summary

Quarter	1	2	3	4	Total
**Raiders**	0	6	7	13	**26**
Ravens	3	6	7	7	**23**

at M&T Bank Stadium, Baltimore, Maryland

- Date: September 15
- Game time: 1:00 p.m. EDT/10:00 a.m. PDT
- Game weather: Clear, 78 °F (26 °C)
- Game attendance: 70,762
- Referee: Tra Blake
- TV announcers (CBS): Andrew Catalon, Tiki Barber and A.J. Ross
- Recap, Game Book

Game information

**First quarter**

- BAL – Justin Tucker 48-yard field goal, 8:28. Ravens 3–0. **Drive: 7 plays, 25 yards, 4:10.**

**Second quarter**

- LV – Daniel Carlson 53-yard field goal, 9:19. Tied 3–3. **Drive: 8 plays, 37 yards, 4:47.**
- BAL – Justin Tucker 42-yard field goal, 6:00. Ravens 6–3. **Drive: 8 plays, 45 yards, 3:19.**
- LV – Daniel Carlson 51-yard field goal, 1:37. Tied 6–6. **Drive: 5 plays, 21 yards, 0:48.**
- BAL – Justin Tucker 32-yard field goal, 0:03. Ravens 9–6. **Drive: 10 plays, 56 yards, 1:34.**

**Third quarter**

- BAL – Zay Flowers 8-yard pass from Lamar Jackson (Justin Tucker kick), 11:42. Ravens 16–6. **Drive: 6 plays, 70 yards, 3:18.**
- LV – Alexander Mattison 1-yard run (Daniel Carlson kick), 2:36. Ravens 16–13. **Drive: 7 plays, 46 yards, 3:32.**

**Fourth quarter**

- BAL – Derrick Henry 3-yard run (Justin Tucker kick), 12:11. Ravens 23–13. **Drive: 9 plays, 76 yards, 5:25.**
- LV – Daniel Carlson 25-yard field goal, 9:21. Ravens 23–16. **Drive: 7 plays, 64 yards, 2:50.**
- LV – Davante Adams 1-yard pass from Gardner Minshew (Daniel Carlson kick), 3:54. Tied 23–23. **Drive: 9 plays, 70 yards, 3:42.**
- LV – Daniel Carlson 38-yard field goal, 0:27. Raiders 26–23. **Drive: 6 plays, 23 yards, 1:54.**

**Top passers**

- LV – Gardner Minshew – 30/38, 276 yards, TD, INT
- BAL – Lamar Jackson – 21/34, 247 yards, TD, INT

**Top rushers**

- LV – Zamir White – 9 rushes, 24 yards
- BAL – Derrick Henry – 18 rushes, 84 yards, TD

**Top receivers**

- LV – Davante Adams – 9 receptions, 110 yards, TD
- BAL – Zay Flowers – 7 receptions, 91 yards, TD

==== Week 3: vs. Carolina Panthers ====
Week 3: Carolina Panthers at Las Vegas Raiders – Game summary

Quarter	1	2	3	4	Total
**Panthers**	7	14	6	9	**36**
Raiders	7	0	0	15	**22**

at Allegiant Stadium, Paradise, Nevada

- Date: September 22
- Game time: 1:05 p.m. PDT
- Game weather: None (indoor stadium)
- Game attendance: 62,417
- Referee: Bill Vinovich
- TV announcers (CBS): Spero Dedes, Adam Archuleta and Aditi Kinkhabwala
- Recap, Game Book

Game information

**First quarter**

- CAR – Chuba Hubbard 6-yard pass from Andy Dalton (Eddy Piñeiro kick), 10:13. Panthers 7–0. **Drive: 9 plays, 70 yards, 4:47.**
- LV – Alexander Mattison 2-yard run (Daniel Carlson kick), 0:24. Tied 7–7. **Drive: 10 plays, 97 yards, 5:24.**

**Second quarter**

- CAR – Diontae Johnson 5-yard pass from Andy Dalton (Eddy Piñeiro kick), 9:28. Panthers 14–7. **Drive: 10 plays, 75 yards, 5:56.**
- CAR – Adam Thielen 31-yard pass from Andy Dalton (Eddy Piñeiro kick), 0:28. Panthers 21–7. **Drive: 4 plays, 68 yards, 0:44.**

**Third quarter**

- CAR – Eddy Piñeiro 43-yard field goal, 9:59. Panthers 24–7. **Drive: 7 plays, 41 yards, 3:22.**
- CAR – Eddy Piñeiro 35-yard field goal, 4:46. Panthers 27–7. **Drive: 6 plays, 20 yards, 3:28.**

**Fourth quarter**

- CAR – Miles Sanders 1-yard run (pass failed), 13:33. Panthers 33–7. **Drive: 11 plays, 84 yards, 4:52.**
- LV – Jakobi Meyers 13-yard pass from Gardner Minshew (Gardner Minshew–Jakobi Meyers pass), 10:56. Panthers 33–15. **Drive: 7 plays, 70 yards, 2:37.**
- CAR – Eddy Piñeiro 26-yard field goal, 4:47. Panthers 36–15. **Drive: 7 plays, 28 yards, 3:47.**
- LV – Tre Tucker 8-yard pass from Aidan O'Connell (Daniel Carlson kick), 0:56. Panthers 36–22. **Drive: 13 plays, 70 yards, 3:51.**

**Top passers**

- CAR – Andy Dalton – 26/37, 319 yards, 3 TD
- LV – Gardner Minshew – 18/28, 214 yards, TD, INT

**Top rushers**

- CAR – Chuba Hubbard – 21 rushes, 114 yards
- LV – Zamir White – 10 rushes, 34 yards

**Top receivers**

- CAR – Diontae Johnson – 8 receptions, 122 yards, TD
- LV – Tre Tucker – 7 receptions, 96 yards, TD

This was the Raiders' first loss to the Panthers since 2012 when they were based in Oakland.

==== Week 4: vs. Cleveland Browns ====
Week 4: Cleveland Browns at Las Vegas Raiders – Game summary

Quarter	1	2	3	4	Total
Browns	10	0	0	6	**16**
**Raiders**	0	10	10	0	**20**

at Allegiant Stadium, Paradise, Nevada

- Date: September 29
- Game time: 1:25 p.m. PDT
- Game weather: None (indoor stadium)
- Game attendance: 62,401
- Referee: Brad Allen
- TV announcers (CBS): Beth Mowins, Jay Feely, Ross Tucker, and Tiffany Blackmon
- Recap, Game Book

Game information

**First quarter**

- CLE – Blake Whiteheart 1-yard pass from Deshaun Watson (Dustin Hopkins kick), 5:38. Browns 7–0. **Drive: 15 plays, 70 yards, 9:22.**
- CLE – Dustin Hopkins 56-yard field goal, 0:35. Browns 10–0. **Drive: 6 plays, 17 yards, 3:20.**

**Second quarter**

- LV – Tre Tucker 3-yard run (Daniel Carlson kick), 9:50. Browns 10–7. **Drive: 11 plays, 70 yards, 5:45.**
- LV – Daniel Carlson 52-yard field goal, 2:52. Tied 10–10. **Drive: 9 plays, 45 yards, 5:06.**

**Third quarter**

- LV – Daniel Carlson 34-yard field goal, 11:28. Raiders 13–10. **Drive: 8 plays, 55 yards, 3:32.**
- LV – D. J. Turner 18-yard run (Daniel Carlson kick), 5:23. Raiders 20–10. **Drive: 6 plays, 52 yards, 2:36.**

**Fourth quarter**

- CLE – Rodney McLeod 25-yard fumble return (Dustin Hopkins kick), 14:50. Raiders 20–16. **Drive: 3 plays, 5 yards, 1:39.**

**Top passers**

- CLE – Deshaun Watson – 24/32, 176 yards, TD, INT
- LV – Gardner Minshew – 14/24, 130 yards

**Top rushers**

- CLE – Jerome Ford – 10 rushes, 58 yards
- LV – Alexander Mattison – 5 rushes, 60 yards

**Top receivers**

- CLE – Jerry Jeudy – 6 receptions, 72 yards
- LV – Jakobi Meyers – 5 receptions, 49 yards

The Raiders kept their winning streak against the Browns alive, not having lost to them since 2014 when they were based in Oakland.

==== Week 5: at Denver Broncos ====
Week 5: Las Vegas Raiders at Denver Broncos – Game summary

Quarter	1	2	3	4	Total
Raiders	10	0	0	8	**18**
**Broncos**	0	13	7	14	**34**

at Empower Field at Mile High, Denver, Colorado

- Date: October 6
- Game time: 2:05 p.m. MDT/1:05 p.m. PDT
- Game weather: Sunny, 73 °F (23 °C)
- Game attendance: 72,825
- Referee: Craig Wrolstad
- TV announcers (Fox): Kevin Kugler, Daryl Johnston and Laura Okmin
- Recap, Game Book

Game information

**First quarter**

- LV – Brock Bowers 57-yard pass from Gardner Minshew (Daniel Carlson kick), 12:57. Raiders 7–0. **Drive: 4 plays, 70 yards, 2:03.**
- LV – Daniel Carlson 40-yard field goal, 1:27. Raiders 10–0. **Drive: 13 plays, 68 yards, 8:06.**

**Second quarter**

- DEN – Wil Lutz 51-yard field goal, 12:23. Raiders 10–3. **Drive: 7 plays, 26 yards, 4:04.**
- DEN – Patrick Surtain II 100-yard interception return for touchdown (Wil Lutz kick), 8:43. Tied 10–10.
- DEN – Wil Lutz 44-yard field goal, 0:00. Broncos 13–10. **Drive: 5 plays, 38 yards, 0:27.**

**Third quarter**

- DEN – Jaleel McLaughlin 4-yard pass from Bo Nix (Wil Lutz kick), 7:01. Broncos 20–10. **Drive: 6 plays, 50 yards, 3:00.**

**Fourth quarter**

- DEN – Bo Nix 1-yard run (Wil Lutz kick), 10:12. Broncos 27–10. **Drive: 8 plays, 58 yards, 4:48.**
- DEN – Josh Reynolds 9-yard pass from Bo Nix (Wil Lutz kick), 8:14. Broncos 34–10. **Drive: 4 plays, 39 yards, 1:53.**
- LV – Ameer Abdullah 3-yard run (Alexander Mattison run), 4:01. Broncos 34–18. **Drive: 12 plays, 75 yards, 4:13.**

**Top passers**

- LV – Gardner Minshew – 12/17, 137 yards, TD, 2 INT
- DEN – Bo Nix – 19/27, 206 yards, 2 TD

**Top rushers**

- LV – Ameer Abdullah – 5 rushes, 42 yards, TD
- DEN – Javonte Williams – 13 rushes, 61 yards

**Top receivers**

- LV – Brock Bowers – 8 receptions, 97 yards, TD
- DEN – Javonte Williams – 5 receptions, 50 yards

After starting with a 10–0 lead the Raiders would be outscored 34–8 the remainder of the game. Resulting in their first loss to Denver since 2019. Effectively snapping a 6 game win streak against the Broncos.

==== Week 6: vs. Pittsburgh Steelers ====
Week 6: Pittsburgh Steelers at Las Vegas Raiders – Game summary

Quarter	1	2	3	4	Total
**Steelers**	3	9	10	10	**32**
Raiders	7	0	0	6	**13**

at Allegiant Stadium, Paradise, Nevada

- Date: October 13
- Game time: 1:05 p.m. PDT
- Game weather: None (indoor stadium)
- Game attendance: 62,553
- Referee: Alan Eck
- TV announcers (CBS): Ian Eagle, Charles Davis and Evan Washburn
- Recap, Game Book

Game information

**First quarter**

- PIT – Chris Boswell 52-yard field goal, 10:19. Steelers 3–0. **Drive: 9 plays, 37 yards, 4:41.**
- LV – Alexander Mattison 3-yard run (Daniel Carlson kick), 4:24. Raiders 7–3. **Drive: 10 plays, 70 yards, 5:55.**

**Second quarter**

- PIT – Chris Boswell 49-yard field goal, 12:12. Raiders 7–6. **Drive: 10 plays, 43 yards, 4:00.**
- PIT – Justin Fields 3-yard run (pass failed), 0:34. Steelers 12–7. **Drive: 6 plays, 30 yards, 1:58.**

**Third quarter**

- PIT – Chris Boswell 37-yard field goal, 9:20. Steelers 15–7. **Drive: 4 plays, −10 yards, 1:38.**
- PIT – Najee Harris 36-yard run (Chris Boswell kick), 4:21. Steelers 22–7. **Drive: 7 plays, 80 yards, 3:19.**

**Fourth quarter**

- PIT – Justin Fields 7-yard run (Chris Boswell kick), 8:16. Steelers 29–7. **Drive: 1 play, 7 yards, 0:05.**
- LV – Kristian Wilkerson 9-yard pass from Aidan O'Connell (pass failed), 4:54. Steelers 29–13. **Drive: 10 plays, 70 yards, 3:22.**
- PIT – Chris Boswell 36-yard field goal, 3:55. Steelers 32–13. **Drive: 6 plays, 18 yards, 0:59.**

**Top passers**

- PIT – Justin Fields – 14/24, 145 yards
- LV – Aidan O'Connell – 27/40, 227 yards, TD, INT

**Top rushers**

- PIT – Najee Harris – 14 rushes, 106 yards, TD
- LV – Alexander Mattison – 14 rushes, 33 yards, TD

**Top receivers**

- PIT – George Pickens – 3 receptions, 53 yards
- LV – Brock Bowers – 9 receptions, 71 yards

This defeat marked the Raiders 3rd straight loss to the Steelers since 2022, dropping them 2–4.

==== Week 7: at Los Angeles Rams ====
Week 7: Las Vegas Raiders at Los Angeles Rams – Game summary

Quarter	1	2	3	4	Total
Raiders	0	6	3	6	**15**
**Rams**	0	14	6	0	**20**

at SoFi Stadium, Inglewood, California

- Date: October 20
- Game time: 1:05 p.m. PDT
- Game weather: Sunny, 80 °F (27 °C) (fixed roof)
- Game attendance: 73,267
- Referee: Shawn Hochuli
- TV announcers (CBS): Kevin Harlan, Trent Green and Melanie Collins
- Recap, Game Book

Game information

**First quarter**

- No scoring plays.

**Second quarter**

- LV – Daniel Carlson 38-yard field goal, 14:04. Raiders 3–0. **Drive: 9 plays, 56 yards, 3:29.**
- LAR – Kyren Williams 13-yard run (Joshua Karty kick), 3:00. Rams 7–3. **Drive: 4 plays, 47 yards, 1:47.**
- LAR – Kamren Curl 33-yard fumble return (Joshua Karty kick), 1:14. Rams 14–3. **Drive: 5 plays, 3 yards, 1:46.**
- LV – Daniel Carlson 47-yard field goal, 0:00. Rams 14–6. **Drive: 8 plays, 41 yards, 1:14.**

**Third quarter**

- LAR – Kyren Williams 2-yard run (kick failed, wide right), 7:30. Rams 20–6. **Drive: 8 plays, 41 yards, 1:14.**
- LV – Daniel Carlson 38-yard field goal, 2:25. Rams 20–9. **Drive: 10 plays, 50 yards, 5:05.**

**Fourth quarter**

- LV – Daniel Carlson 27-yard field goal, 14:52. Rams 20–12. **Drive: 4 plays, 5 yards, 1:14.**
- LV – Daniel Carlson 27-yard field goal, 2:46. Rams 20–15. **Drive: 15 plays, 66 yards, 7:25.**

**Top passers**

- LV – Gardner Minshew – 15/34, 154 yards, 3 INT
- LAR – Matthew Stafford – 14/23, 154 yards, INT

**Top rushers**

- LV – Alexander Mattison – 23 rushes, 92 yards
- LAR – Kyren Williams – 21 rushes, 76 yards, 2 TD

**Top receivers**

- LV – Brock Bowers – 10 receptions, 93 yards
- LAR – Tyler Johnson – 4 receptions, 57 yards

==== Week 8: vs. Kansas City Chiefs ====
Week 8: Kansas City Chiefs at Las Vegas Raiders – Game summary

Quarter	1	2	3	4	Total
**Chiefs**	7	10	0	10	**27**
Raiders	7	3	3	7	**20**

at Allegiant Stadium, Paradise, Nevada

- Date: October 27
- Game time: 1:25 p.m. PDT
- Game weather: None (indoor stadium)
- Game attendance: 62,533
- Referee: Adrian Hill
- TV announcers (CBS): Kevin Harlan, Trent Green and Melanie Collins
- Recap, Game Book

Game information

**First quarter**

- KC – Kareem Hunt 1-yard run (Harrison Butker kick), 10:02. Chiefs 7–0. **Drive: 9 plays, 70 yards, 4:58.**
- LV – Jakobi Meyers 7-yard pass from Gardner Minshew (Daniel Carlson kick), 2:39. Tied 7–7. **Drive: 12 plays, 70 yards, 7:23.**

**Second quarter**

- LV – Daniel Carlson 54-yard field goal, 10:13. Raiders 10–7. **Drive: 10 plays, 50 yards, 5:46.**
- KC – Travis Kelce 5-yard pass from Patrick Mahomes (Harrison Butker kick), 1:57. Chiefs 14–10. **Drive: 13 plays, 70 yards, 8:16.**
- KC – Harrison Butker 42-yard field goal, 0:04. Chiefs 17–10. **Drive: 9 plays, 56 yards, 0:54.**

**Third quarter**

- LV – Daniel Carlson 32-yard field goal, 6:40. Chiefs 17–13. **Drive: 10 plays, 14 yards, 5:51.**

**Fourth quarter**

- KC – Harrison Butker 24-yard field goal, 8:44. Chiefs 20–13. **Drive: 19 plays, 87 yards, 9:43.**
- KC – Xavier Worthy 9-yard pass from Patrick Mahomes (Harrison Butker kick), 4:59. Chiefs 27–13. **Drive: 8 plays, 38 yards, 3:01.**
- LV – D. J. Turner 11-yard pass from Gardner Minshew (Daniel Carlson kick), 2:39. Chiefs 27–20. **Drive: 12 plays, 70 yards, 7:23.**

**Top passers**

- KC – Patrick Mahomes – 27/38, 262 yards, 2 TD, INT
- LV – Gardner Minshew – 24/30, 209 yards, 2 TD

**Top rushers**

- KC – Kareem Hunt – 21 rushes, 59 yards, TD
- LV – Alexander Mattison – 14 rushes, 15 yards

**Top receivers**

- KC – Travis Kelce – 10 receptions, 90 yards, TD
- LV – Brock Bowers – 5 receptions, 58 yards

==== Week 9: at Cincinnati Bengals ====
Week 9: Las Vegas Raiders at Cincinnati Bengals – Game summary

Quarter	1	2	3	4	Total
Raiders	7	3	0	14	**24**
**Bengals**	7	10	14	10	**41**

at Paycor Stadium, Cincinnati, Ohio

- Date: November 3
- Game time: 1:00 p.m. EST/10:00 a.m. PST
- Game weather: Sunny, 67 °F (19 °C)
- Game attendance: 65,962
- Referee: Brad Rogers
- TV announcers (Fox): Kevin Kugler, Daryl Johnston and Laura Okmin
- Recap, Game Book

Game information

**First quarter**

- LV – Zamir White 1-yard run (Daniel Carlson kick), 9:36. Raiders 7–0. **Drive: 11 plays, 70 yards, 5:24.**
- CIN – Chase Brown 1-yard pass from Joe Burrow (Evan McPherson kick), 1:39. Tied 7–7. **Drive: 13 plays, 70 yards, 7:57.**

**Second quarter**

- CIN – Evan McPherson 44-yard field goal, 7:00. Bengals 10–7. **Drive: 14 plays, 64 yards, 6:29.**
- LV – Daniel Carlson 46-yard field goal, 2:58. Tied 10–10. **Drive: 7 plays, 42 yards, 4:02.**
- CIN – Andrei Iosivas 10-yard pass from Joe Burrow (Evan McPherson kick), 0:32. Bengals 17–10. **Drive: 5 plays, 70 yards, 2:26.**

**Third quarter**

- CIN – Drew Sample 2-yard pass from Joe Burrow (Evan McPherson kick), 11:27. Bengals 24–10. **Drive: 7 plays, 70 yards, 3:33.**
- CIN – Mike Gesicki 11-yard pass from Joe Burrow (Evan McPherson kick), 7:34. Bengals 31–10. **Drive: 5 plays, 21 yards, 2:08.**

**Fourth quarter**

- LV – Jack Jones 29-yard interception return (Daniel Carlson kick), 13:17. Bengals 31–17.
- CIN – Mike Gesicki 47-yard pass from Joe Burrow (Evan McPherson kick), 5:37. Bengals 38–17. **Drive: 6 plays, 64 yards, 0:59.**
- CIN – Evan McPherson 27-yard field goal, 1:53. Bengals 41–17. **Drive: 7 plays, 4 yards, 3:36.**
- LV – Brock Bowers 22-yard pass from Desmond Ridder (Daniel Carlson kick), 0:41. Bengals 41–24. **Drive: 6 plays, 70 yards, 1:12.**

**Top passers**

- LV – Gardner Minshew – 10/17, 124 yards
- CIN – Joe Burrow – 27/39, 251 yards, 5 TD, INT

**Top rushers**

- LV – Alexander Mattison – 9 rushes, 36 yards
- CIN – Chase Brown – 27 rushes, 120 yards

**Top receivers**

- LV – Jakobi Meyers – 8 receptions, 105 yards
- CIN – Mike Gesicki – 5 receptions, 100 yards, 2 TD

==== Week 11: at Miami Dolphins ====
Week 11: Las Vegas Raiders at Miami Dolphins – Game summary

Quarter	1	2	3	4	Total
Raiders	3	3	6	7	**19**
**Dolphins**	7	3	7	17	**34**

at Hard Rock Stadium, Miami Gardens, Florida

- Date: November 17
- Game time: 1:00 p.m. EST/10:00 a.m. PST
- Game weather: Cloudy, 80 °F (27 °C)
- Game attendance: 65,440
- Referee: John Hussey
- TV announcers (CBS): Tom McCarthy, Jay Feely, Ross Tucker and Tiffany Blackmon
- Recap, Game Book

Game information

**First quarter**

- MIA – Jonnu Smith 1-yard pass from Tua Tagovailoa (Jason Sanders kick), 6:47. Dolphins 7–0. **Drive: 14 plays, 70 yards, 8:13.**
- LV – Daniel Carlson 27-yard field goal, 0:08. Dolphins 7–3. **Drive: 12 plays, 61 yards, 6:39.**

**Second quarter**

- MIA – Jason Sanders 31-yard field goal, 6:46. Dolphins 10–3. **Drive: 16 plays, 52 yards, 8:22.**
- LV – Daniel Carlson 22-yard field goal, 0:45. Dolphins 10–6. **Drive: 16 plays, 66 yards, 6:01.**

**Third quarter**

- MIA – Tyreek Hill 8-yard pass from Tua Tagovailoa (Jason Sanders kick), 4:13. Dolphins 17–6. **Drive: 14 plays, 97 yards, 7:47.**
- LV – Brock Bowers 23-yard pass from Gardner Minshew (run failed), 1:21. Dolphins 17–12. **Drive: 8 plays, 70 yards, 2:52.**

**Fourth quarter**

- MIA – De'Von Achane 2-yard run (Jason Sanders kick), 10:37. Dolphins 24–12. **Drive: 10 plays, 60 yards, 5:44.**
- LV – Ameer Abdullah 10-yard pass from Gardner Minshew (Daniel Carlson kick), 4:23. Dolphins 24–19. **Drive: 14 plays, 70 yards, 6:14.**
- MIA – Jonnu Smith 57-yard pass from Tua Tagovailoa (Jason Sanders kick), 3:19. Dolphins 31–19. **Drive: 4 plays, 70 yards, 1:04.**
- MIA – Jason Sanders 46-yard field goal, 1:55. Dolphins 34–19. **Drive: 4 plays, 3 yards, 1:17.**

**Top passers**

- LV – Gardner Minshew – 30/43, 282 yards, 2 TD, INT
- MIA – Tua Tagovailoa – 28/36, 288 yards, 3 TD

**Top rushers**

- LV – Jakobi Meyers – 1 rush, 20 yards
- MIA – De'Von Achane – 17 rushes, 73 yards, TD

**Top receivers**

- LV – Brock Bowers – 13 receptions, 126 yards, TD
- MIA – Jonnu Smith – 6 receptions, 101 yards, 2 TD

==== Week 12: vs. Denver Broncos ====
Week 12: Denver Broncos at Las Vegas Raiders – Game summary

Quarter	1	2	3	4	Total
**Broncos**	3	6	7	13	**29**
Raiders	0	13	0	6	**19**

at Allegiant Stadium, Paradise, Nevada

- Date: November 24
- Game time: 1:05 p.m. PST
- Game weather: None (indoor stadium)
- Game attendance: 62,460
- Referee: Ronald Torbert
- TV announcers (CBS): Kevin Harlan, Trent Green and Melanie Collins
- Recap, Game Book

Game information

**First quarter**

- DEN – Wil Lutz 38-yard field goal, 2:47. Broncos 3–0. **Drive: 8 plays, 47 yards, 5:07.**

**Second quarter**

- LV – Ameer Abdullah 6-yard pass from Gardner Minshew (Daniel Carlson kick), 13:36. Raiders 7–3. **Drive: 7 plays, 40 yards, 4:11.**
- DEN – Wil Lutz 53-yard field goal, 9:21. Raiders 7–6. **Drive: 8 plays, 35 yards, 4:15.**
- LV – Daniel Carlson 34-yard field goal, 3:48. Raiders 10–6. **Drive: 11 plays, 54 yards, 5:33.**
- DEN – Wil Lutz 54-yard field goal, 0:53. Raiders 10–9. **Drive: 8 plays, 34 yards, 2:55.**
- LV – Daniel Carlson 34-yard field goal, 0:00. Raiders 13–9. **Drive: 7 plays, 54 yards, 0:53.**

**Third quarter**

- DEN – Courtland Sutton 18-yard pass from Bo Nix (Wil Lutz kick), 10:49. Broncos 16–13. **Drive: 2 plays, 18 yards, 0:44.**

**Fourth quarter**

- DEN – Wil Lutz 45-yard field goal, 12:05. Broncos 19–13. **Drive: 10 plays, 26 yards, 4:22.**
- LV – Daniel Carlson 53-yard field goal, 8:59. Broncos 19–16. **Drive: 7 plays, 35 yards, 3:06.**
- DEN – Courtland Sutton 2-yard pass from Bo Nix (Wil Lutz kick), 5:30. Broncos 26–16. **Drive: 7 plays, 70 yards, 3:29.**
- LV – Daniel Carlson 22-yard field goal, 3:38. Broncos 26–19. **Drive: 11 plays, 66 yards, 1:52.**
- DEN – Wil Lutz 33-yard field goal, 1:56. Broncos 29–19. **Drive: 4 plays, 2 yards, 0:25.**

**Top passers**

- DEN – Bo Nix – 25/42, 273 yards, 2 TD
- LV – Gardner Minshew – 25/42, 230 yards, TD, INT

**Top rushers**

- DEN – Jaleel McLaughlin – 7 rushes, 44 yards
- LV – Sincere McCormick – 5 rushes, 33 yards

**Top receivers**

- DEN – Courtland Sutton – 8 receptions, 97 yards, 2 TD
- LV – Jakobi Meyers – 10 receptions, 121 yards

With the loss, the Raiders were not only swept by the Broncos for the first time since 2014, but also due to the Chiefs win over the Panthers, the Raiders were mathematically incapable of clinching the AFC West for the 21st year in a row. The loss also tied them with the Giants for the worst record in the NFL.

==== Week 13: at Kansas City Chiefs ====
Black Friday games

Week 13: Las Vegas Raiders at Kansas City Chiefs – Game summary

Quarter	1	2	3	4	Total
Raiders	0	3	7	7	**17**
**Chiefs**	3	7	6	3	**19**

at Arrowhead Stadium, Kansas City, Missouri

- Date: November 29
- Game time: 2:00 p.m. CST/12:00 p.m. PST
- Game weather: 37 °F (3 °C)
- Game attendance: 73,627
- Referee: Clay Martin
- TV announcers (Prime Video): Al Michaels, Kirk Herbstreit and Kaylee Hartung
- Recap, Game Book

Game information

**First quarter**

- KC – Matthew Wright 25-yard field goal, 10:06. Chiefs 3–0. **Drive: 13 plays, 66 yards, 4:54.**

**Second quarter**

- LV – Daniel Carlson 27-yard field goal, 11:03. Tied 3–3. **Drive: 10 plays, 83 yards, 6:20.**
- KC – Justin Watson 6-yard pass from Patrick Mahomes (Matthew Wright kick), 2:14. Chiefs 10–3. **Drive: 7 plays, 53 yards, 3:41.**

**Third quarter**

- KC – Matthew Wright 42-yard field goal, 8:40. Chiefs 13–3. **Drive: 7 plays, 46 yards, 3:05.**
- KC – Matthew Wright 35-yard field goal, 3:11. Chiefs 16–3. **Drive: 7 plays, 38 yards, 1:17.**
- LV – Brock Bowers 33-yard pass from Aidan O'Connell (Daniel Carlson kick), 1:40. Chiefs 16–10. **Drive: 2 plays, 26 yards, 1:31.**

**Fourth quarter**

- LV – Tre Tucker 58-yard pass from Aidan O'Connell (Daniel Carlson kick), 14:52. Raiders 17–16. **Drive: 2 plays, 69 yards, 0:13.**
- KC – Matthew Wright 32-yard field goal, 9:53. Chiefs 19–17. **Drive: 11 plays, 56 yards, 4:59.**

**Top passers**

- LV – Aidan O'Connell – 23/35, 340 yards, 2 TD
- KC – Patrick Mahomes – 26/46, 306 yards, TD

**Top rushers**

- LV – Sincere McCormick – 12 rushes, 64 yards
- KC – Isiah Pacheco – 7 rushes, 44 yards

**Top receivers**

- LV – Brock Bowers – 10 receptions, 140 yards, TD
- KC – DeAndre Hopkins – 4 receptions, 90 yards

With the loss, the Raiders fell to 2–10, suffered their eighth straight loss, the team's longest losing streak since 2014, and became the second team eliminated from playoff contention. Also, with the Denver Broncos Monday night win over the Cleveland Browns, the Raiders would seal a last place finish in the AFC West.

==== Week 14: at Tampa Bay Buccaneers ====
Week 14: Las Vegas Raiders at Tampa Bay Buccaneers – Game summary

Quarter	1	2	3	4	Total
Raiders	0	10	0	3	**13**
**Buccaneers**	14	0	0	14	**28**

at Raymond James Stadium, Tampa, Florida

- Date: December 8
- Game time: 1:00 p.m. EST/10:00 a.m. PST
- Game weather: Cloudy, 71 °F (22 °C)
- Game attendance: 63,250
- Referee: Alan Eck
- TV announcers (CBS): Spero Dedes, Adam Archuleta, and Aditi Kinkhabwala
- Recap, Game Book

Game information

**First quarter**

- TB – Jalen McMillan 15-yard pass from Baker Mayfield (Chase McLaughlin kick), 8:07. Buccaneers 7–0. **Drive: 12 plays, 85 yards, 6:53.**
- TB – Rachaad White 5-yard pass from Baker Mayfield (Chase McLaughlin kick), 3:52. Buccaneers 14–0. **Drive: 5 plays, 52 yards, 2:45.**

**Second quarter**

- LV – Aidan O'Connell 1-yard run (Daniel Carlson kick), 9:21. Buccaneers 14–7. **Drive: 6 plays, 45 yards, 2:42.**
- LV – Daniel Carlson 25-yard field goal, 4:28. Buccaneers 14–10. **Drive: 7 plays, 46 yards, 3:14.**

**Third quarter**

- No scoring plays.

**Fourth quarter**

- TB – Rachaad White 3-yard run (Chase McLaughlin kick), 8:47. Buccaneers 21–10. **Drive: 6 plays, 77 yards, 2:59.**
- LV – Daniel Carlson 27-yard field goal, 3:05. Buccaneers 21–13. **Drive: 11 plays, 57 yards, 5:42.**
- TB – Jalen McMillan 29-yard pass from Baker Mayfield (Chase McLaughlin kick), 1:56. Buccaneers 28–13. **Drive: 5 plays, 80 yards, 1:09.**

**Top passers**

- LV – Aidan O'Connell – 11/19, 104 yards, INT
- TB – Baker Mayfield – 18/29, 295 yards, 3 TD, 2 INT

**Top rushers**

- LV – Sincere McCormick – 15 rushes, 78 yards
- TB – Rachaad White – 17 rushes, 90 yards, TD

**Top receivers**

- LV – Michael Mayer – 7 receptions, 68 yards
- TB – Cade Otton – 3 receptions, 70 yards

==== Week 15: vs. Atlanta Falcons ====
Week 15: Atlanta Falcons at Las Vegas Raiders – Game summary

Quarter	1	2	3	4	Total
**Falcons**	7	2	3	3	**15**
Raiders	0	3	0	6	**9**

at Allegiant Stadium, Paradise, Nevada

- Date: December 16
- Game time: 5:30 p.m. PST
- Game weather: None (indoor stadium)
- Game attendance: 62,364
- Referee: Shawn Smith
- TV announcers (KVVU, WUPA): Chris Fowler, Dan Orlovsky, Louis Riddick and Laura Rutledge
  Game exclusive to KVVU and WUPA. ESPN is blacked out in Las Vegas and Atlanta markets because of NFL Syndication exclusivity policies.
- Recap, Game Book

Game information

**First quarter**

- ATL – Drake London 30-yard pass from Kirk Cousins (Younghoe Koo kick), 0:14. Falcons 7–0. **Drive: 6 plays, 51 yards, 3:30.**

**Second quarter**

- LV – Daniel Carlson 52-yard field goal, 11:44. Falcons 7–3. **Drive: 9 plays, 37 yards, 3:30.**
- ATL – Alexander Mattison loss of 1 yard for a safety, 5:35. Falcons 9–3.

**Third quarter**

- ATL – Younghoe Koo 40-yard field goal, 9:25. Falcons 12–3. **Drive: 6 plays, 15 yards, 2:48.**

**Fourth quarter**

- ATL – Younghoe Koo 48-yard field goal, 13:26. Falcons 15–3. **Drive: 7 plays, 18 yards, 3:34.**
- LV – Ameer Abdullah 5-yard pass from Desmond Ridder (kick blocked), 2:54. Falcons 15–9. **Drive: 9 plays, 68 yards, 2:33.**

**Top passers**

- ATL – Kirk Cousins – 11/17, 112 yards, TD, INT
- LV – Desmond Ridder – 23/39, 208 yards, TD, 2 INT

**Top rushers**

- ATL – Bijan Robinson – 22 rushes, 125 yards
- LV – Desmond Ridder – 5 rushes, 28 yards

**Top receivers**

- ATL – Drake London – 3 receptions, 53 yards, TD
- LV – Jakobi Meyers – 5 receptions, 59 yards

The Raiders once again failed to beat the Falcons, not having done so since 2000 when they were based in Oakland.

==== Week 16: vs. Jacksonville Jaguars ====
Week 16: Jacksonville Jaguars at Las Vegas Raiders – Game summary

Quarter	1	2	3	4	Total
Jaguars	7	0	7	0	**14**
**Raiders**	0	13	0	6	**19**

at Allegiant Stadium, Paradise, Nevada

- Date: December 22
- Game time: 1:25 p.m. PST
- Game weather: None (indoor stadium)
- Game attendance: 61,323
- Referee: Shawn Hochuli
- TV announcers (CBS): Andrew Catalon, Tiki Barber, Jason McCourty and A.J. Ross
- Recap, Game Book

Game information

**First quarter**

- JAX – Tank Bigsby 1-yard run (Cam Little kick), 1:32. Jaguars 7–0. **Drive: 6 plays, 29 yards, 2:32.**

**Second quarter**

- LV – Alexander Mattison 1-yard run (Daniel Carlson kick), 14:05. Tied 7–7. **Drive: 6 plays, 70 yards, 2:27.**
- LV – Daniel Carlson 49-yard field goal, 10:28. Raiders 10–7. **Drive: 6 plays, 33 yards, 2:11.**
- LV – Daniel Carlson 37-yard field goal, 3:56. Raiders 13–7. **Drive: 10 plays, 44 yards, 5:05.**

**Third quarter**

- JAX – Brian Thomas Jr. 62-yard pass from Mac Jones (Cam Little kick), 0:54. Jaguars 14–13. **Drive: 3 plays, 64 yards, 1:24.**

**Fourth quarter**

- LV – Ameer Abdullah 7-yard run (pass failed), 11:26. Raiders 19–14. **Drive: 10 plays, 70 yards, 4:28.**

**Top passers**

- JAX – Mac Jones – 25/39, 247 yards, TD
- LV – Aidan O'Connell – 24/38, 257 yards

**Top rushers**

- JAX – Tank Bigsby – 12 rushes, 50 yards, TD
- LV – Ameer Abdullah – 7 rushes, 38 yards, TD

**Top receivers**

- JAX – Brian Thomas Jr. – 9 receptions, 132 yards, TD
- LV – Brock Bowers – 11 receptions, 99 yards

With the win the Raiders snapped their 10 game losing streak and improved to 3–12.

==== Week 17: at New Orleans Saints ====
Week 17: Las Vegas Raiders at New Orleans Saints – Game summary

Quarter	1	2	3	4	Total
**Raiders**	3	10	3	9	**25**
Saints	0	10	0	0	**10**

at Caesars Superdome, New Orleans, Louisiana

- Date: December 29
- Game time: 12:00 p.m. CST/10:00 a.m. PST
- Game weather: None (indoor stadium)
- Game attendance: 70,031
- Referee: Land Clark
- TV announcers (Fox): Adam Amin, Mark Sanchez and Kristina Pink
- Recap, Game Book

Game information

**First quarter**

- LV – Daniel Carlson 31-yard field goal, 5:49. Raiders 3–0. **Drive: 17 plays, 60 yards, 9:11.**

**Second quarter**

- NO – Foster Moreau 30-yard pass from Spencer Rattler (Blake Grupe kick), 14:52. Saints 7–3. **Drive: 3 plays, 50 yards, 0:53.**
- LV – Daniel Carlson 39-yard field goal, 10:19. Saints 7–6. **Drive: 8 plays, 53 yards, 4:33.**
- LV – Jakobi Meyers 3-yard pass from Aidan O'Connell (Daniel Carlson kick), 0:57. Raiders 13–7. **Drive: 9 plays, 95 yards, 3:24.**
- NO – Blake Grupe 34-yard field goal, 0:00. Raiders 13–10. **Drive: 7 plays, 54 yards, 0:57.**

**Third quarter**

- LV – Daniel Carlson 54-yard field goal, 7:57. Raiders 16–10. **Drive: 10 plays, 49 yards, 4:56.**

**Fourth quarter**

- LV – Daniel Carlson 25-yard field goal, 14:14. Raiders 19–10. **Drive: 12 plays, 54 yards, 5:37.**
- LV – Tre Tucker 18-yard pass from Aidan O'Connell (kick blocked), 8:20. Raiders 25–10. **Drive: 6 plays, 40 yards, 3:02.**

**Top passers**

- LV – Aidan O'Connell – 20/35, 242 yards, 2 TD
- NO – Spencer Rattler – 20/36, 218 yards, TD, 2 INT

**Top rushers**

- LV – Ameer Abdullah – 20 rushes, 115 yards
- NO – Spencer Rattler – 3 rushes, 46 yards

**Top receivers**

- LV – Brock Bowers – 7 receptions, 77 yards
- NO – Juwan Johnson – 6 receptions, 66 yards

==== Week 18: vs. Los Angeles Chargers ====
Week 18: Los Angeles Chargers at Las Vegas Raiders – Game summary

Quarter	1	2	3	4	Total
**Chargers**	3	14	3	14	**34**
Raiders	3	7	3	7	**20**

at Allegiant Stadium, Paradise, Nevada

- Date: January 5
- Game time: 1:25 p.m. PST
- Game weather: None (indoor stadium)
- Game attendance: 61,352
- Referee: Carl Cheffers
- TV announcers (CBS): Kevin Harlan, Trent Green and Melanie Collins
- Recap, Game Book

Game information

**First quarter**

- LV – Daniel Carlson 40-yard field goal, 2:46. Raiders 3–0. **Drive: 7 plays, 37 yards, 2:17.**
- LAC – Cameron Dicker 33-yard field goal, 0:11. Tied 3–3. **Drive: 6 plays, 55 yards, 2:35.**

**Second quarter**

- LV – Jakobi Meyers 25-yard pass from Aidan O'Connell (Daniel Carlson kick), 13:04. Raiders 10–3. **Drive: 5 plays, 70 yards, 2:07.**
- LAC – Cameron Dicker 32-yard field goal, 5:28. Raiders 10–6. **Drive: 15 plays, 56 yards, 7:36.**
- LAC – Cameron Dicker 49-yard field goal, 1:05. Raiders 10–9. **Drive: 9 plays, 52 yards, 2:47.**
- LAC – D. J. Chark 6-yard pass from Justin Herbert (Justin Herbert-Ladd McConkey pass), 0:10. Chargers 17–10. **Drive: 4 plays, 30 yards, 0:28.**

**Third quarter**

- LAC – Cameron Dicker 20-yard field goal, 7:10. Chargers 20–10. **Drive: 13 plays, 69 yards, 7:50.**
- LV – Daniel Carlson 47-yard field goal, 2:15. Chargers 20–13. **Drive: 8 plays, 41 yards, 4:55.**

**Fourth quarter**

- LAC – Will Dissly 2-yard pass from Justin Herbert (Cameron Dicker kick), 13:32. Chargers 27–13. **Drive: 7 plays, 70 yards, 3:43.**
- LAC – Hassan Haskins 2-yard run (Cameron Dicker kick), 3:38. Chargers 34–13. **Drive: 12 plays, 81 yards, 7:12.**
- LV – Brock Bowers 12-yard pass from Aidan O'Connell (Daniel Carlson kick), 0:25. Chargers 34–20. **Drive: 12 plays, 70 yards, 3:13.**

**Top passers**

- LAC – Justin Herbert – 28/36, 346 yards, 2 TD
- LV – Aidan O'Connell – 24/34, 214 yards, 2 TD, INT

**Top rushers**

- LAC – J. K. Dobbins – 18 rushes, 63 yards
- LV – Alexander Mattison – 6 rushes, 20 yards

**Top receivers**

- LAC – Quentin Johnston – 13 receptions, 186 yards
- LV – Jakobi Meyers – 9 receptions, 123 yards, TD

With the loss the Raiders finished the season at 4–13 while going winless against the AFC West for the first time since 2006.

=== Standings ===
==== Division ====
AFC West
	W	L	T	PCT	DIV	CONF	PF	PA	STK
^{(1)} Kansas City Chiefs	15	2	0	.882	5–1	10–2	385	326	L1
^{(5)} Los Angeles Chargers	11	6	0	.647	4–2	8–4	402	301	W3
^{(7)} Denver Broncos	10	7	0	.588	3–3	6–6	425	311	W1
Las Vegas Raiders	4	13	0	.235	0–6	3–9	309	434	L1

==== Conference ====
AFC
Seed	Team	Division	W	L	T	PCT	DIV	CONF	SOS	SOV	STK
**Division leaders**
1	Kansas City Chiefs	West	15	2	0	.882	5–1	10–2	.488	.463	L1
2	Buffalo Bills	East	13	4	0	.765	5–1	9–3	.467	.448	L1
3	Baltimore Ravens	North	12	5	0	.706	4–2	8–4	.529	.525	W4
4	Houston Texans	South	10	7	0	.588	5–1	8–4	.481	.376	W1
**Wild cards**
5	Los Angeles Chargers	West	11	6	0	.647	4–2	8–4	.467	.348	W3
6 (Note: Pittsburgh clinched the #6 seed over Denver based on head-to-head victory.)	Pittsburgh Steelers	North	10	7	0	.588	3–3	7–5	.502	.453	L4
7	Denver Broncos	West	10	7	0	.588	3–3	6–6	.502	.394	W1
**Did not qualify for the postseason**
8	Cincinnati Bengals	North	9	8	0	.529	3–3	6–6	.478	.314	W5
9 (Note: Indianapolis finished ahead of Miami based on head-to-head victory.)	Indianapolis Colts	South	8	9	0	.471	3–3	7–5	.457	.309	W1
10	Miami Dolphins	East	8	9	0	.471	3–3	6–6	.419	.294	L1
11	New York Jets	East	5	12	0	.294	2–4	5–7	.495	.341	W1
12 (Note: Jacksonville finished ahead of New England and Las Vegas based on conference record. (Jacksonville 4–8 to New England 3–9 to Las Vegas 3–9))	Jacksonville Jaguars	South	4	13	0	.235	3–3	4–8	.478	.265	L1
13 (Note: New England finished ahead of Las Vegas based on strength of victory. (New England .471 to Las Vegas .353))	New England Patriots	East	4	13	0	.235	2–4	3–9	.471	.471	W1
14	Las Vegas Raiders	West	4	13	0	.235	0–6	3–9	.540	.353	L1
15 (Note: Cleveland finished ahead of Tennessee based on strength of victory. (Cleveland .510 to Tennessee .431))	Cleveland Browns	North	3	14	0	.176	2–4	3–9	.536	.510	L6
16	Tennessee Titans	South	3	14	0	.176	1–5	3–9	.522	.431	L6
