= Jordan Meredith =

American football player (born 1998)

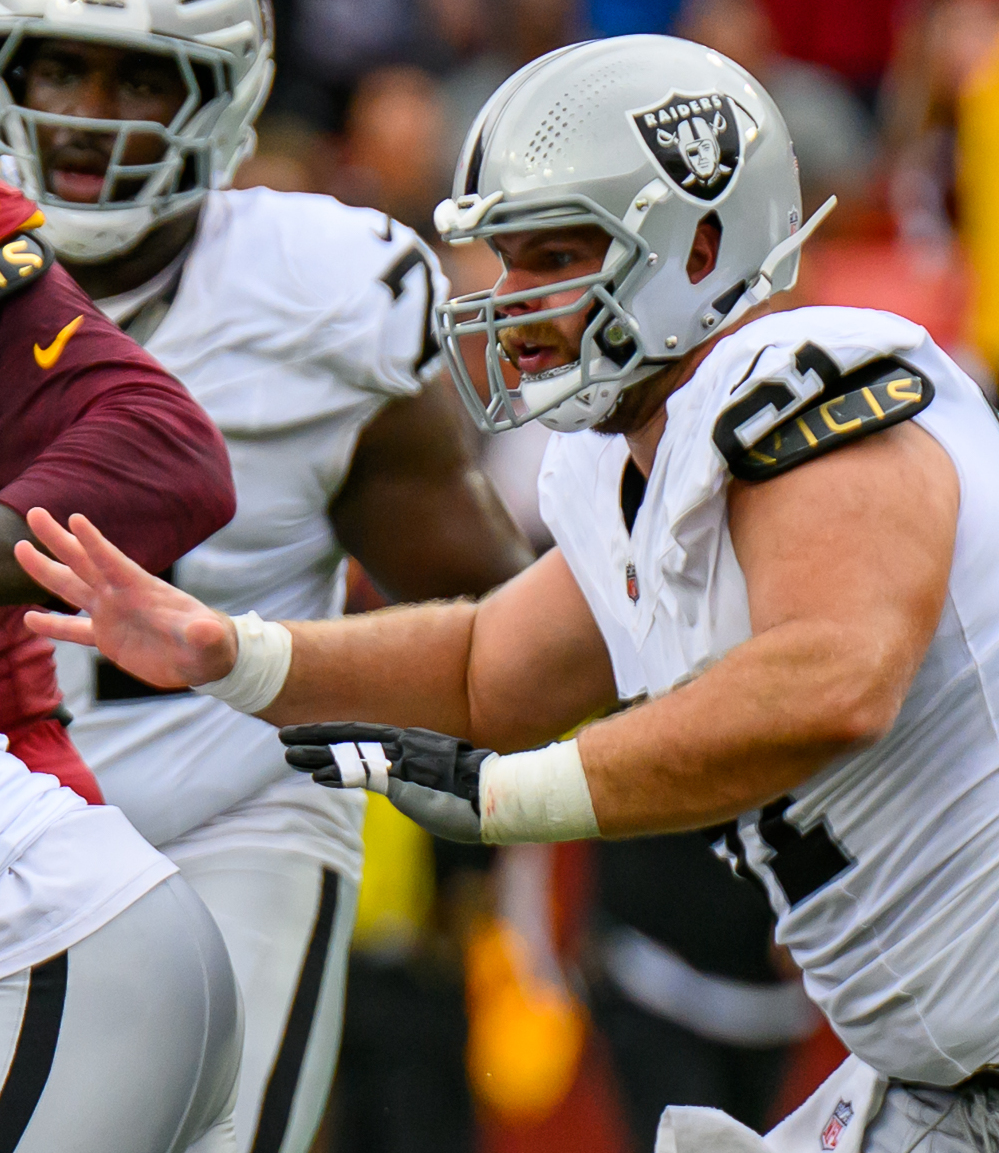
- Meredith with the Las Vegas Raiders in 2025

New York Jets
- Position: Guard
- Roster status: Active

Personal information
- Born: January 4, 1998 (age 28); Bowling Green, Kentucky, U.S.
- Listed height: 6 ft 2 in (1.88 m)
- Listed weight: 301 lb (137 kg)

Career information
- High school: Bowling Green
- College: Western Kentucky (2016–2020)
- NFL draft: 2021: undrafted

Career history
- Los Angeles Rams (2021)*; Las Vegas Raiders (2022–2025); New York Jets (2026–present)
- * Offseason or practice squad member only

Career NFL statistics as of 2025
- Games played: 45
- Games started: 20
- Stats at Pro Football Reference

Jordan Meredith (born January 4, 1998) is an American professional football guard for the New York Jets of the National Football League (NFL). He played college football for the Western Kentucky Hilltoppers.

== Professional career ==
Pre-draft measurables
Height	Weight	Arm length	Hand span	Wingspan	40-yard dash	10-yard split	20-yard split	20-yard shuttle	Three-cone drill	Vertical jump	Broad jump	Bench press
6 ft 2 3/4 in (1.90 m)	302 lb (137 kg)	31 in (0.79 m)	10 in (0.25 m)	6 ft 1 1/4 in (1.86 m)	5.11 s	1.75 s	2.87 s	4.62 s	7.41 s	32.0 in (0.81 m)	9 ft 1 in (2.77 m)	25 reps
All values from Pro Day

=== Los Angeles Rams ===
On May 2, 2021, Meredith signed with the Los Angeles Rams as an undrafted free agent. However, he was released before the start of the regular season on August 30.

=== Las Vegas Raiders ===
Meredith was signed by the Las Vegas Raiders on February 19, 2022. He was waived on July 20, but re-signed with the team on July 25 after Denzelle Good retired. He was waived during final roster cuts on August 30, and re–signed to the practice squad the following day. He made his NFL debut in a Week 15 win against the New England Patriots. On January 9, 2023, Meredith signed a reserve/future contract with the Raiders.

Meredith entered the 2024 season as a backup guard, and started eight games at both guard spots. In 2025, he was named the Raiders' starting center, and started the team's first 11 games. On December 22, 2025, Meredith was placed on season-ending injured reserve due to an ankle injury.

Designated as a restricted free agent in the 2026 offseason, the Raiders tendered him on March 10, 2026, and signed on April 7.

=== New York Jets ===
On August 30, 2026, Meredith and a 2029 seventh-round pick were traded to the New York Jets in exchange for a 2027 sixth-round pick.

== NFL career statistics ==
Legend
**Bold**	Career high

=== Regular season ===
Year	Team	Games		Tackles					Interceptions						Fumbles				
Year	Team	GP	GS	Cmb	Solo	Ast	Sck	TFL	Int	Yds	Avg	Lng	TD	PD	FF	Fum	FR	Yds	TD
2022	LV	1	0	0	0	0	0.0	0	0	0	0.0	0	0	0	0	0	**1**	0	0
2023	LV	**17**	1	0	0	0	0.0	0	0	0	0.0	0	0	0	0	0	0	0	0
2024	LV	14	8	0	0	0	0.0	0	0	0	0.0	0	0	0	0	0	0	0	0
2025	LV	13	**11**	0	0	0	0.0	0	0	0	0.0	0	0	0	0	**1**	0	0	0
Career		45	20	0	0	0	0.0	0	0	0	0.0	0	0	0	0	1	1	0	0
