= Champ Kelly =

American football executive (born 1980)

Personal information
- Born: 1980 (age 45–46); Campbellton, Florida, U.S.

Career information
- Position: Safety
- College: Kentucky (1998–2001)

Career history

Playing
- Lexington Horsemen (2003–2006)

Coaching
- Lexington Horsemen (2007) Wide receivers coach

Operations
- Lexington Horsemen (2007) General manager; Denver Broncos (2007) College scout; Denver Broncos (2008–2009) Assistant coordinator of pro and college scouting; Denver Broncos (2010–2014) Assistant director of pro personnel; Chicago Bears (2015–2016) Director of pro scouting; Chicago Bears (2017–2021) Assistant director of player personnel; Las Vegas Raiders (2022–2023) Assistant general manager; Las Vegas Raiders (2023–2024) Interim general manager; Miami Dolphins (2025) Senior personnel executive/Interim general manager
- Executive profile at Pro Football Reference

Anthony "Champ" Kelly (born 1980) is an American football executive and former wide receiver and cornerback who most recently served as the interim general manager for the Miami Dolphins of the National Football League (NFL). He has previously served as the assistant general manager for the Las Vegas Raiders, as well as assistant director of player personnel for the Chicago Bears from 2017 to 2021 and the director of pro scouting from 2015 to 2016. Before joining the Bears in 2015, Kelly was a member of the Denver Broncos staff and was with the Lexington Horsemen of the United Indoor Football (UIF) as general manager, coach, and player.

== Playing career ==
Kelly played college football at Kentucky as a wide receiver and cornerback from 1998 to 2001. He played professional indoor football for the Lexington Horsemen from 2003 to 2006, winning Indoor Bowl IV in 2004. He earned first-team All-United Indoor Football honors in both 2005 and 2006.

== Executive career ==
=== Lexington Horsemen ===
After retiring as a player, Kelly stayed with the Horsemen as wide receivers coach and general manager in 2007.

=== Denver Broncos ===
Kelly joined the Broncos in 2007 as the Northeast college scout before being appointed assistant director of pro personnel.

=== Chicago Bears ===
Kelly joined the Chicago Bears in 2015 as the team's director of pro scouting. He was promoted to assistant director of player personnel in 2017. His main responsibilities were grading the top 100 draft prospects, leading the team's efforts in free agency, and advance scouting. In 2019, Kelly was a candidate in the New York Jets' general manager search, in November 2020 he was candidate for the Atlanta Falcons job and in January 2021 he was interviewed for the Denver Broncos GM position.

=== Las Vegas Raiders ===
On February 2, 2022, Kelly was named the assistant general manager of the Las Vegas Raiders. On November 1, 2023, Kelly was named the Raiders' interim general manager after the firing of general manager Dave Ziegler, keeping the title until Tom Telesco was hired to replace Ziegler on January 23, 2024. On February 17, 2025, it was announced that Raiders and Kelly mutually agreed to part ways.

=== Miami Dolphins ===
On March 14, 2025, Kelly was hired by the Miami Dolphins to serve as a senior personnel executive. After general manager Chris Grier mutually parted ways with the team on October 31, Kelly was named the Dolphins' interim general manager. Kelly was replaced by Jon-Eric Sullivan as general manager on January 9, 2026. On April 29, Kelly and the Dolphins have ways.

== Personal life ==
Kelly and his wife Stephanie have three daughters. He was born in Campbellton, Florida. He founded Heart Power, a nonprofit which has hosted youth programs in several states. Kelly graduated from Kentucky with a master's in business administration and a bachelor's in computer science. He worked for IBM as a software and quality engineer from 2002 to 2005.
