= Amari Burney =

American football player (born 2000)

Profile
- Position: Linebacker

Personal information
- Born: June 12, 2000 (age 26); St. Petersburg, Florida, U.S.
- Listed height: 6 ft 2 in (1.88 m)
- Listed weight: 228 lb (103 kg)

Career information
- High school: Calvary Christian (Clearwater, Florida)
- College: Florida (2018–2022)
- NFL draft: 2023: 6th round, 203rd overall pick

Career history
- Las Vegas Raiders (2023–2024); Tennessee Titans (2025)*; Jacksonville Jaguars (2026)*
- * Offseason or practice squad member only

Career NFL statistics as of 2024
- Total tackles: 32
- Sacks: 1
- Forced fumbles: 1
- Stats at Pro Football Reference

Amari Burney (born June 12, 2000) is an American professional football linebacker. He played college football for the Florida Gators.

== College career ==
Burney played at Florida from 2018 to 2022. He amassed 224 total tackles (121 solo), 15 sacks, four interceptions, 12 passes defended, two forced fumbles, and two fumble recoveries.

== Professional career ==
Pre-draft measurables
Height	Weight	Arm length	Hand span	Wingspan	40-yard dash	10-yard split	20-yard split	20-yard shuttle	Three-cone drill	Vertical jump	Broad jump
6 ft 1 3/8 in (1.86 m)	233 lb (106 kg)	31 3/4 in (0.81 m)	9 5/8 in (0.24 m)	6 ft 5 in (1.96 m)	4.51 s	1.62 s	2.57 s	4.20 s	7.00 s	33.0 in (0.84 m)	10 ft 0 in (3.05 m)
All values from Pro Day

=== Las Vegas Raiders ===
Burney was selected by the Las Vegas Raiders in the sixth round, 203rd overall, of the 2023 NFL draft.

On May 12, 2025, Burney was waived by the Raiders.

=== Tennessee Titans ===
On May 13, 2025, Burney was claimed off waivers by the Tennessee Titans. He was waived by the Titans on August 25.

=== Jacksonville Jaguars ===
On August 11, 2026, Burney signed with the Jacksonville Jaguars. On August 30, he was waived by Jacksonville as a part of final roster cuts.
