= David Agoha =

Nigerian gridiron football player (born 2001)

David Ebuka Agoha
No. 53 – Denver Broncos
- Position: Outside linebacker
- Roster status: International

Personal information
- Born: 18 May 2001 (age 25); Aguleri, Eastern Region, (Anambra State, Nigeria)
- Listed height: 6 ft 4 in (1.93 m)
- Listed weight: 252 lb (114 kg)

Career information
- NFL draft: 2023: undrafted

Career history
- Las Vegas Raiders (2023–2024)*; Tennessee Titans (2025)*; Denver Broncos (2026–present)*
- * Offseason or practice squad member only
- Stats at Pro Football Reference

David Ebuka Agoha (born 18 May 2001) is a Nigerian professional American football outside linebacker for the Denver Broncos of the National Football League (NFL). He was signed as an undrafted free agent by the Las Vegas Raiders in 2023. Agoha has also been a member of the Tennessee Titans.

== Biography ==
David Agoha was born in Aguleri, Anambra, Nigeria.

Agoha, originally from Bende in Abia State, Nigeria, was first discovered by Olutobi and Iseolupo Adepitan, founders of Educational Basketball, while playing for the Invaders Basketball Academy of Ado Ekiti in Nigeria's Premier Basketball League. He was later discovered by former New York Giants player Osi Umenyiora's Uprise camp.

In 2023, Agoha became one of six Nigerian players to join an NFL club for the season, having been selected through the International Player Pathway Program.

=== Las Vegas Raiders ===
On May 12, 2023, Agoha was signed by the Las Vegas Raiders. He signed a reserve/future contract with Las Vegas on January 6, 2025. On April 30, Agoha was released by the Raiders.

=== Tennessee Titans ===
On October 21, 2025, Agoha signed with the Tennessee Titans' practice squad. He signed a reserve/future with Tennessee contract on January 5, 2026. Agoha was waived by the Titans on August 2, following the signing of Laki Tasi.

=== Denver Broncos ===
On August 31, 2026, Agoha signed to the Denver Broncos' practice squad.
