= Dalton Wagner =

American football player (born 1998)

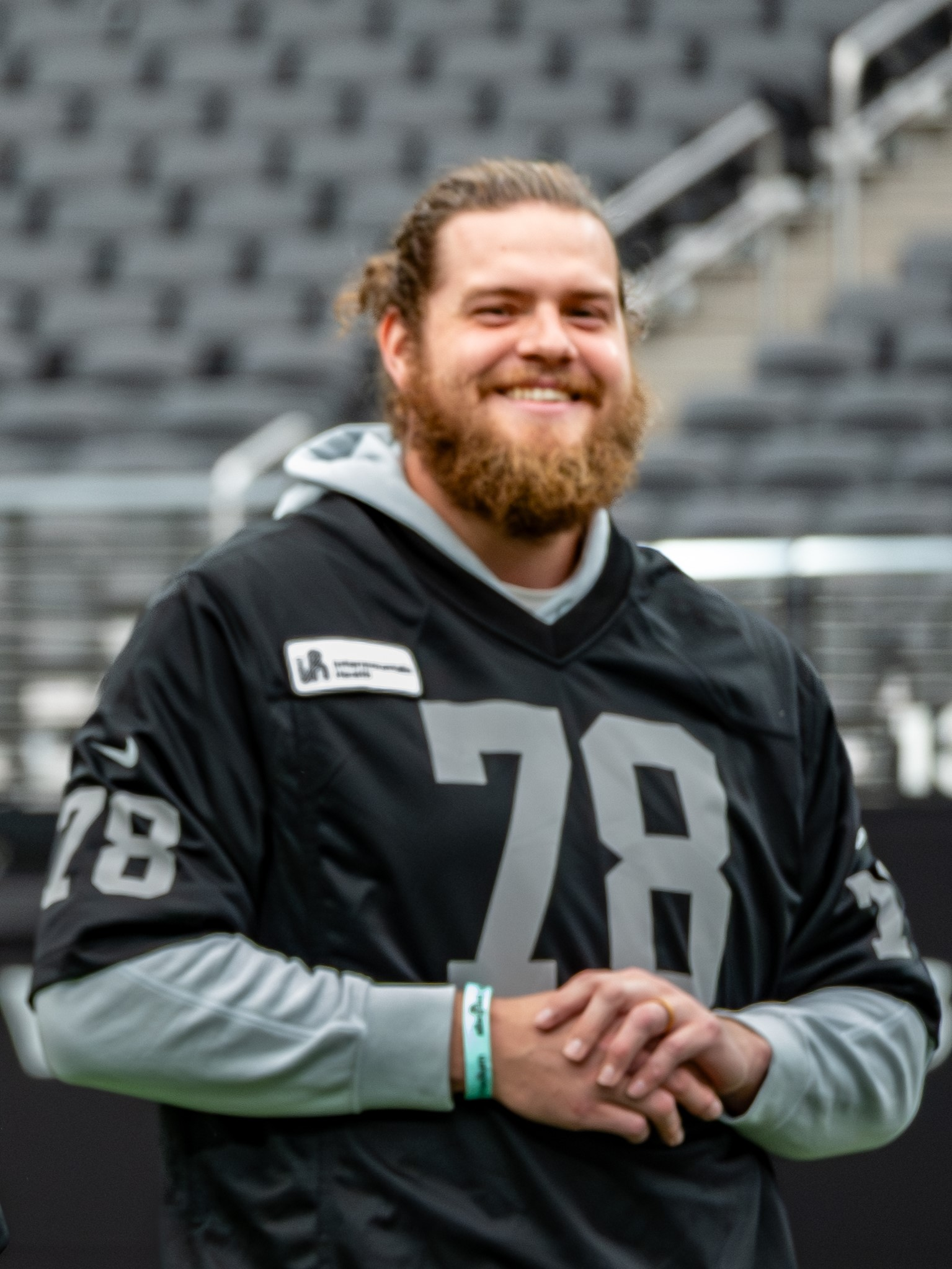
- Wagner with the Raiders in 2024

Louisville Kings
- Position: Offensive tackle
- Roster status: Unsigned draft pick

Personal information
- Born: October 5, 1998 (age 28); Libertyville, Illinois, U.S.
- Listed height: 6 ft 8 in (2.03 m)
- Listed weight: 318 lb (144 kg)

Career information
- High school: Richmond-Burton (Richmond, Illinois)
- College: Arkansas (2017–2022)
- NFL draft: 2023: undrafted

Career history
- Las Vegas Raiders (2023–2025); Louisville Kings (2027-present)

Awards and highlights
- Second-team All-SEC (2022)

Career NFL statistics as of 2025
- Games played: 1
- Stats at Pro Football Reference

Dalton Wagner (born October 5, 1998) is an American professional football offensive tackle. He played college football for the Arkansas Razorbacks and was signed by the Raiders as an undrafted free agent in 2023.

== Early life and education ==
Wagner was born on October 5, 1998, and grew up in Spring Grove, Illinois. He attended Richmond-Burton High School and was a consensus three-star recruit, being a starter for three seasons and being ranked the best player at his position in the state by Scout.com. He committed to play college football for the Arkansas Razorbacks. In his first season at the school, 2017, he redshirted.

Wagner appeared in 11 games during the 2018 season before becoming a full-time starter in 2019. In the COVID-19-shortened 2020 season, he played eight games and was only given three penalties. Wagner started 10 games in 2021, missing three due to injury, and helped Arkansas lead all Power Five teams in rushing yards per game. He partnered with WWE by signing a name, image and likeness (NIL) contract in December 2021.

In 2022, Wagner returned to the team by using an extra year of eligibility granted due to COVID-19, and was named team captain. He started all 12 games, being named first-team All-SEC by Pro Football Focus (PFF). He was invited to the East–West Shrine Bowl after the season and finished his college career with 40 games started.

== Professional career ==
Pre-draft measurables
Height	Weight	Arm length	Hand span	Wingspan	40-yard dash	10-yard split	20-yard split	20-yard shuttle	Three-cone drill	Vertical jump	Broad jump	Bench press
6 ft 8 in (2.03 m)	320 lb (145 kg)	34 3/8 in (0.87 m)	10 1/2 in (0.27 m)	6 ft 11 1/4 in (2.11 m)	5.43 s	1.84 s	3.09 s	4.90 s	8.00 s	27.5 in (0.70 m)	8 ft 6 in (2.59 m)	24 reps
All values from NFL Combine/Pro Day

Although some projected Wagner to be a late-round pick in the 2023 NFL draft, he went unselected. Afterwards, he was signed by the Las Vegas Raiders as an undrafted free agent, being given a contract that included $225,000 guaranteed, which was the largest among their undrafted signees. He was placed on injured reserve on August 29, 2023.

On August 27, 2024, Wagner was waived by the Raiders and re-signed to the practice squad. He signed a reserve/future contract with Las Vegas on January 6, 2025.

On August 26, 2025, Wagner was waived by the Raiders as a part of final roster cuts and re-signed to the practice squad the next day. He signed a reserve/future contract with Las Vegas on January 5, 2026.

On August 30, 2026, Wagner was waived by the Raiders as a part of final roster cuts.
