= D. J. Turner (wide receiver) =

American football player (born 1997)

Profile
- Position: Wide receiver

Personal information
- Born: January 18, 1997 (age 29); Glenarden, Maryland, U.S.
- Listed height: 5 ft 9 in (1.75 m)
- Listed weight: 206 lb (93 kg)

Career information
- High school: DeMatha Catholic (Hyattsville, Maryland)
- College: Maryland (2016–2019); Pittsburgh (2020)
- NFL draft: 2021: undrafted

Career history
- Las Vegas Raiders (2021–2025); Houston Texans (2026)*
- * Offseason or practice squad member only

Career NFL statistics as of Week 4, 2024
- Receptions: 1
- Receiving yards: 9
- Rushing yards: 46
- Rushing touchdowns: 1
- Stats at Pro Football Reference

Darryl "D.J" Turner II (born January 18, 1997) is an American professional football wide receiver. He played college football for the Maryland Terrapins and Pittsburgh Panthers.

== College career ==
Turner played college football at the University of Maryland, College Park for four years before transferring to the University of Pittsburgh for his final year. During his career, he had 68 receptions for 928 yards and four touchdowns.

== Professional career ==
Pre-draft measurables
Height	Weight	Arm length	Hand span	Wingspan	40-yard dash	10-yard split	20-yard split	20-yard shuttle	Three-cone drill	Vertical jump	Broad jump
5 ft 9 in (1.75 m)	206 lb (93 kg)	28 1/2 in (0.72 m)	8 1/4 in (0.21 m)	5 ft 9 1/4 in (1.76 m)	4.59 s	1.45 s	2.65 s	4.16 s	6.92 s	35.5 in (0.90 m)	10 ft 1 in (3.07 m)
All values from Pro Day

=== Las Vegas Raiders ===
Turner signed with the Las Vegas Raiders as an undrafted free agent in 2021. After spending his first season on the practice squad, he made the team's 53-man roster in 2022. On September 14, 2022, Turner was placed on the injured reserve list. He was activated on October 22. Turner was waived by the Raiders on December 17 and re-signed to practice squad three days later.

Turner signed a reserve/future contract with Las Vegas on January 9, 2023. He was waived/injured by the team on August 12, and placed on injured reserve. Turner was waived again on August 17. On October 16, the Raiders re–signed Turner to their practice squad. He was promoted to the active roster on November 11.

On October 21, 2025, Turner was re–signed to the Raiders' practice squad.

=== Houston Texans ===
On July 29, 2026, Turner signed with the Houston Texans. He was placed on injured reserve on August 4, and later released on August 11.
