= Dave Ziegler =

American football executive (born 1977)

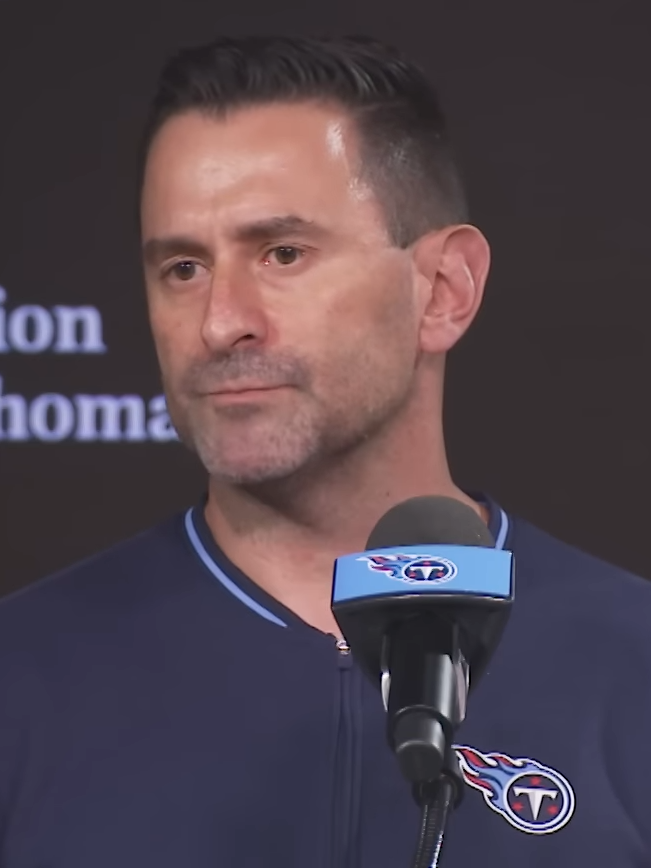
- Ziegler in 2025

Tennessee Titans
- Title: Assistant general manager

Personal information
- Born: September 7, 1977 (age 49); Tallmadge, Ohio, U.S.

Career information
- Positions: Wide receiver, Return specialist
- College: John Carroll

Career history

Coaching
- John Carroll (2004–2005) Graduate assistant; Iona (2006) Wide receivers/special teams coach; Chaparral HS (AZ) (2007–2009) Assistant coach

Operations
- Denver Broncos (2010–2012); Player personnel assistant (2010); Scout (2011–2012); New England Patriots (2013–2021); Assistant director of pro scouting (2013–2015); Director of pro personnel (2016–2019); Assistant director of player personnel (2020); Director of player personnel (2021); Las Vegas Raiders (2022–2023) General manager; New Orleans Saints (2024) Personnel advisor; Tennessee Titans (2025–present) Assistant general manager

Awards and highlights
- 3× Super Bowl champion (XLIX, LI, LIII)
- Executive profile at Pro Football Reference

David Ziegler (born September 7, 1977) is an American professional football executive who currently serves as an assistant general manager for the Tennessee Titans of the National Football League (NFL). He began his career as a scout for the Denver Broncos in the early 2010s before becoming a senior personnel executive for the New England Patriots. Ziegler also worked two seasons as general manager of the Las Vegas Raiders in the early 2020s.

== Early life ==
A native of Tallmadge, Ohio, Ziegler played college football at John Carroll University as a wide receiver, kick returner and punt returner. from 1997 to 2000. He was a three-time First Team All-Ohio Athletic Conference selection a kick and punt returner. He set school records for career punt return average (16.9), kick return average (34.4), punt return touchdowns (3), and kick return touchdowns (4). He was teammates with Houston Texans' general manager Nick Caserio, former Las Vegas Raiders and Denver Broncos head coach Josh McDaniels, and NFL assistant coach Jerry Schuplinski.

== Coaching ==
After graduating from JCU in 2000, Ziegler worked as a teacher in Ohio and Arizona. He returned to John Carroll in 2004 as a graduate assistant. After two seasons, Ziegler became the wide receivers and special teams at Iona College. While at Iona, Ziegler supplemented his income by working as an extra in television shows. In 2007, Ziegler joined the faculty at Chaparral High School as a guidance counselor and assistant football coach.

== Executive career ==
=== Denver Broncos ===
In 2010, Ziegler's former college roommate, Josh McDaniels, was named head coach of the Denver Broncos and brought Ziegler on as a player personnel assistant. He was promoted to area scout in 2011 and to pro scout in 2012.

=== New England Patriots ===
In 2013, Ziegler was hired by the New England Patriots as their assistant director of pro scouting, a position he held until 2015. In 2016, he was promoted to director of pro personnel. In 2020, Ziegler was promoted to assistant director of player personnel. In 2021, he was promoted to director of player personnel, replacing Nick Caserio following his departure to become the general manager of the Houston Texans.

=== Las Vegas Raiders ===
On January 30, 2022, Ziegler was named the general manager of the Las Vegas Raiders. On October 31, 2023, he was fired by the Raiders.

=== New Orleans Saints ===
On February 26, 2024, the New Orleans Saints hired Ziegler to serve as an advisor to the team through the 2024 NFL draft. On July 24, Ziegler was hired by New Orleans full–time as a personnel advisor.

=== Tennessee Titans ===
On January 26, 2025, the Tennessee Titans hired Ziegler as their assistant general manager, under newly-hired, first-time general manager Mike Borgonzi.

== Personal life ==
Ziegler and his wife have three children.
