= 2021 Las Vegas Raiders season =

62nd season in franchise history, first playoff berth since 2016

- Owner: Mark Davis; Carol Davis
- General manager: Mike Mayock
- Head coach: Jon Gruden (resigned October 11, 3–2 record); Rich Bisaccia (interim; 7–5 record)
- Offensive coordinator: Greg Olson
- Defensive coordinator: Gus Bradley
- Home stadium: Allegiant Stadium

Results
- Record: 10–7
- Division place: 2nd AFC West
- Playoffs: Lost Wild Card Playoffs (at Bengals) 19–26
- All-Pros: 3: DE Maxx Crosby (2nd team); K Daniel Carlson (2nd team); P A. J. Cole III (1st team)
- Pro Bowlers: 4: LB Denzel Perryman; DE Maxx Crosby; P A. J. Cole III; WR Hunter Renfrow (alternate)

Uniform
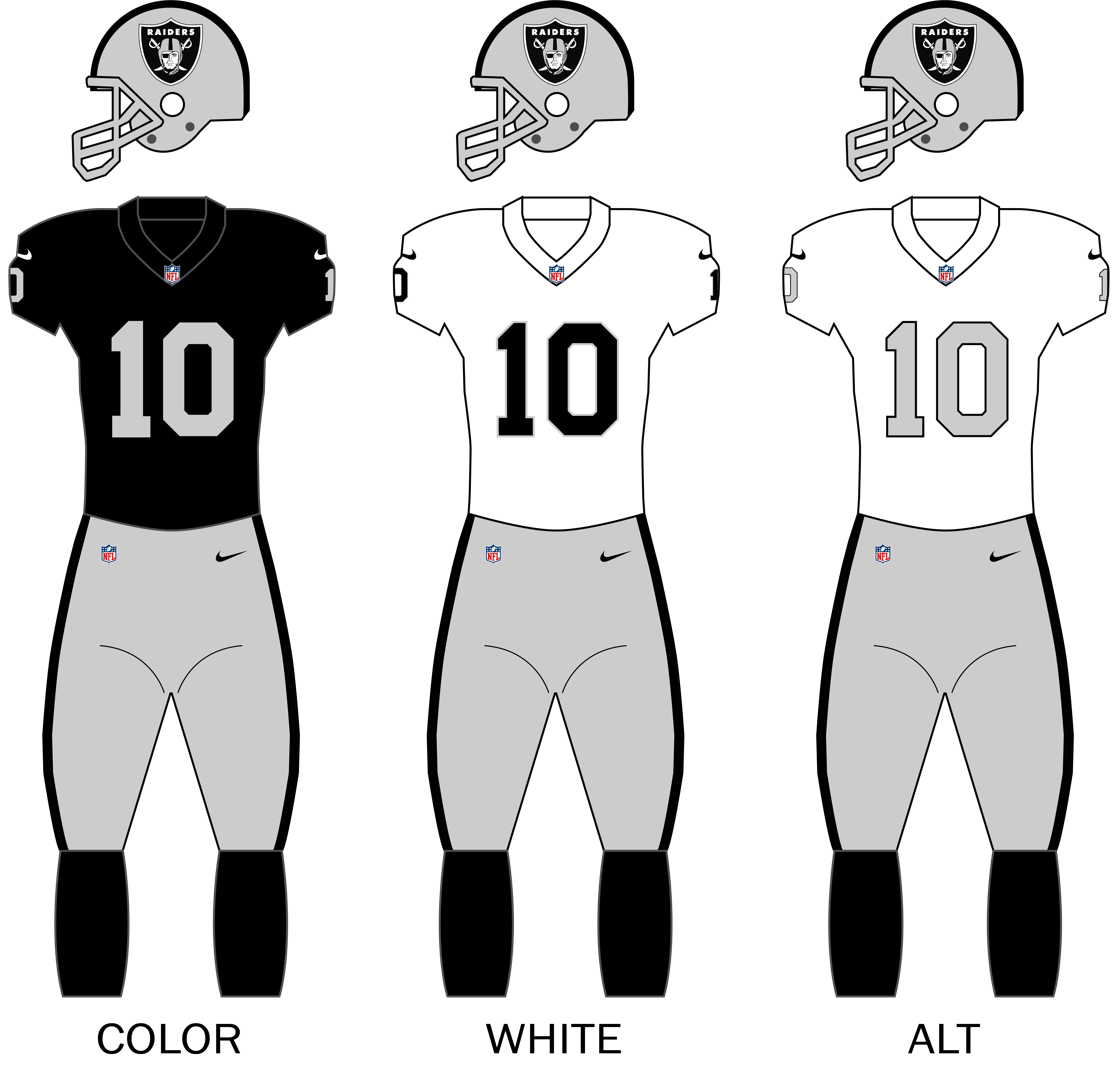

The 2021 season was the Las Vegas Raiders' 52nd season in the National Football League (NFL), their 62nd overall, their second in the Las Vegas metropolitan area, and their eighth (fourth in his second stint) and final under head coach Jon Gruden. The season marked the first regular season to consist of 17 games. With a week 17 win over the Indianapolis Colts, the Raiders clinched their first winning season since 2016 and their second since 2002 when they lost Super Bowl XXXVII. After beating the rival Los Angeles Chargers in Week 18, the Raiders made the postseason for the first time since 2016 and their first in Las Vegas. Interim head coach Rich Bisaccia became the first interim head coach since Bruce Arians in 2012 with the Indianapolis Colts to lead their team to a postseason berth. The Raiders finished the season 10–7 and secured the fifth seed in the AFC playoffs.

However, their season ended with a 26–19 loss against the eventual AFC champion Cincinnati Bengals in the wild-card round, which was Cincinnati's first playoff win since 1990. Ironically in 1990, the Raiders defeated the Bengals in that season's divisional playoffs, which began Cincinnati's playoff drought, which had been the longest drought without a playoff win in the 4 North American sports at the time. The loss extended the Raiders' drought to 19 seasons, the second longest in the NFL. The Raiders also won four overtime games during the season, a feat equaled only by the Arizona Cardinals and Denver Broncos in 2011.

Despite the relatively successful season, it was marred by coach and player controversies. On October 11, Gruden resigned due to the publication of homophobic, misogynistic, and racist emails he sent prior to becoming the Raiders head coach. Special teams coach Bisaccia was named the interim coach. The season was also marred by controversies involving three of their draft picks from 2020 and 2021, respectively: first-round pick Henry Ruggs, who was involved in a fatal drunk-driving car crash and was sentenced in 2023 to 3-10 years in prison; Damon Arnette, another first-round pick who was discovered in a video showing him brandishing firearms and making death threats; and fifth-round pick Nate Hobbs, who was arrested in Las Vegas for driving under the influence following the team's Week 17 win against the Indianapolis Colts. Ruggs and Arnette were released during the season while Hobbs remained with the team till the end of the 2024 season.

== Offseason ==
=== Notable acquisitions ===
| Position | Player | Age | 2020 team |
|---|---|---|---|
| RB | Kenyan Drake | 27 | Arizona Cardinals |
| DE | Yannick Ngakoue | 26 | Minnesota Vikings/Baltimore Ravens |
| DT | Quinton Jefferson | 28 | Buffalo Bills |
| WR | John Brown | 31 | Buffalo Bills |
| DT | Matt Dickerson | 25 | Tennessee Titans |
| DT | Solomon Thomas | 25 | San Francisco 49ers |
| C | Nick Martin | 27 | Houston Texans |
| CB | Casey Hayward | 31 | Los Angeles Chargers |

=== Trades ===
| March 17, 2021 | To Las Vegas Raiders 2021 3rd-round pick | To Arizona Cardinals Rodney Hudson; CHI's 2021 7th-round pick |
| March 17, 2021 | To Las Vegas Raiders 2022 5th round pick | To New England Patriots Trent Brown; 2022 7th round pick |
| March 21, 2021 | To Las Vegas Raiders 2021 5th round pick | To Seattle Seahawks Gabe Jackson |

=== Draft ===
2021 Las Vegas Raiders Draft
| Round | Selection | Player | Position | College |
|---|---|---|---|---|
| 1 | 17 | Alex Leatherwood | OT | Alabama |
| 2 | 43 | Trevon Moehrig | S | TCU |
| 3 | 79 | Malcolm Koonce | LB | Buffalo |
| 3 | 80 | Divine Deablo | S | Virginia Tech |
| 4 | 143 | Tyree Gillespie | S | Missouri |
| 5 | 167 | Nate Hobbs | CB | Illinois |
| 6 | 230 | Jimmy Morrissey | C | Pittsburgh |

Notes

- The Raiders made two separate trades with the Miami Dolphins. First, the Raiders traded their fourth-round selection to the Dolphins in exchange for linebacker Raekwon McMillan and the Dolphins' fifth-round selection. Then, the Dolphins traded the Raiders' fourth-round selection back to the Raiders in exchange for wide receiver Lynn Bowden and the Raiders' sixth-round selection.
- The Raiders traded their fifth-round selection to the Buffalo Bills in exchange for wide receiver Zay Jones.
- The Raiders received the Seattle Seahawks' fifth-round selection after sending offensive guard Gabe Jackson to the Seahawks.
- The Raiders forfeited their sixth-round selection as the punishment for repeated COVID-19 protocol violations during the 2020 season.
- The Raiders traded their seventh-round selection and offensive tackle David Sharpe to the Washington Football Team in exchange for Washington's sixth-round selection. Due to the forfeiture of the Raiders' original sixth-round selection, the Dolphins will likely be the recipient of this selection.

2021 Las Vegas Raiders undrafted free agents
| Name | Position | College | Ref. |
|---|---|---|---|
| Matt Bushman | TE | BYU | |
| Shaun Crawford | CB | Notre Dame | |
| Garrett Groshek | RB | Wisconsin | |
| Devery Hamilton | T | Duke | |
| TJ Morrison | CB | Stony Brook | |
| Trey Ragas | RB | Louisiana | |
| Max Richardson | LB | Boston College | |
| Darius Stills | DT | West Virginia | |
| Dillon Stoner | WR | Oklahoma State | |
| DJ Turner | WR | Pittsburgh | |

== Staff ==
2021 Las Vegas Raiders staff
| Front office: Owner – Mark and Carol Davis; Interim president/executive vice president/general counsel – Dan Ventrelle; General manager – Mike Mayock; Senior vice president/director of football administration – Tom Delaney; Assistant director of player personnel – DuJuan Daniels; Assistant director of player personnel – Trey Scott; Vice president of football operations – Tom Jones; Director of pro personnel – Dwayne Joseph; Director of college scouting – Jim Abrams; Assistant director of college scouting – Teddy Atlas; Senior advisor to the owner and president – Marcel Reece; Senior advisor to the general manager – Walter Juliff; Head coaches: Interim head coach/special teams coordinator – Rich Bisaccia; Offensive coaches: Offensive coordinator – Greg Olson; Senior offensive assistant – John Morton; Running backs – Tim Berbenich; Wide receivers – Edgar Bennett; Assistant wide receivers – Nick Holz; Tight ends – Austin King; Offensive line – Tom Cable; Assistant offensive line – Cameron Clemmons; Offensive assistant – Taver Johnson | Defensive coaches: Defensive coordinator – Gus Bradley; Defensive line – Rod Marinelli; Assistant defensive line – Travis Smith; Linebackers – Richard Smith; Defensive backs – Ron Milus; Assistant defensive backs – Addison Lynch; Defensive quality control – Ryan Milus; Special teams coaches: Assistant special teams – Byron Storer; Strength and conditioning: Head strength and conditioning – A. J. Neibel; Strength and conditioning assistant – D'Anthony Batiste; Strength and conditioning assistant – Deuce Gruden; Strength and conditioning assistant – Rick Slate; Nutritionist – Ricky Ng |

== Final roster ==
2021 Las Vegas Raiders roster
| Quarterbacks (QB): 4 Derek Carr; 8 Marcus Mariota; Running backs (RB): 31 Peyton Barber; 28 Josh Jacobs; 30 Jalen Richard; 41 Sutton Smith FB; Wide receivers (WR): 89 Bryan Edwards; 1 DeSean Jackson; 17 Tyron Johnson; 7 Zay Jones; 13 Hunter Renfrow; Tight ends (TE): 82 Nick Bowers; 85 Derek Carrier; 87 Foster Moreau; 83 Darren Waller | Offensive linemen (OL): 78 Jackson Barton T; 72 Jermaine Eluemunor G; 68 Andre James C; 70 Alex Leatherwood G; 66 Nick Martin C; 74 Kolton Miller T; 75 Brandon Parker T; 60 Jordan Simmons G; 76 John Simpson G; Defensive linemen (DL): 98 Maxx Crosby DE; 99 Clelin Ferrell DE; 90 Johnathan Hankins DT; 77 Quinton Jefferson DT; 51 Malcolm Koonce DE; 94 Carl Nassib DE; 91 Yannick Ngakoue DE; 92 Solomon Thomas DT; 95 Kendal Vickers DT | Linebackers (LB): 5 Divine Deablo OLB; 55 Marquel Lee MLB; 42 Cory Littleton OLB; 48 Patrick Onwuasor MLB; 52 Denzel Perryman MLB; 58 Kyle Wilber MLB; 34 K. J. Wright OLB; Defensive backs (DB): 35 Brandon Facyson CB; 37 Tyree Gillespie SS; 29 Casey Hayward CB; 39 Nate Hobbs CB; 32 Dallin Leavitt FS; 25 Trevon Moehrig FS; 22 Keisean Nixon CB; 21 Amik Robertson CB; 33 Roderic Teamer FS; 10 Desmond Trufant CB; Special teams (ST): 2 Daniel Carlson K; 6 A. J. Cole III P; 47 Trent Sieg LS | Practice squad: 38 Jordan Brown FS; 20 Tony Brown CB; -- Isaiah Buggs DT; 67 Lester Cotton G; 43 Kavon Frazier SS; 65 Hroniss Grasu C; 56 Gerri Green DE; 86 Daniel Helm TE; 54 P. J. Johnson DT; 53 Justin March OLB; 3 Nathan Peterman QB; 79 Jeremiah Poutasi G; 36 Trey Ragas RB; 97 Damion Square DT; 16 Dillon Stoner WR; 19 D. J. Turner WR; Reserve: 24 Johnathan Abram SS (IR); 23 Kenyan Drake RB (IR); 71 Denzelle Good G (IR); 64 Richie Incognito G (IR); 45 Alec Ingold FB (IR); 44 Nick Kwiatkoski MLB (IR); 93 Gerald McCoy DT (IR); 50 Nicholas Morrow MLB (IR); 27 Trayvon Mullen CB (IR); 96 Darius Philon DT (IR); 63 Kamaal Seymour T (NF-Inj.); Rookies in italics 53 active, 11 reserve, 16 practice squad |

== Preseason ==
| Week | Date | Opponent | Result | Record | Venue | Recap |
|---|---|---|---|---|---|---|
| 1 | August 14 | Seattle Seahawks | W 20–7 | 1–0 | Allegiant Stadium | Recap |
| 2 | August 21 | at Los Angeles Rams | W 17–16 | 2–0 | SoFi Stadium | Recap |
| 3 | August 29 | at San Francisco 49ers | L 10–34 | 2–1 | Levi's Stadium | Recap |

== Regular season ==
=== Season overview ===
==== Resignation of executives ====
In August 2021, CBS Sports noted that several Raiders team executives, including president Marc Badain, V.P. of strategy and business development Brian Doll, CFO Ed Villanueva, and club controller Araxie Grant, had abruptly resigned their post within months of each other. Peter King of NBC Sports speculated that Badain's resignation may have had something to do with team finances.

==== Resignation of Jon Gruden ====
Gruden initially started the season as the Raiders head coach. However, prior to week five against the Chicago Bears, emails sent by Gruden (while he was employed by ESPN) prior to rejoining the Raiders as coach were leaked, which described Gruden using racist language to describe NFLPA director DeMaurice Smith. The Raiders made no announcement prior to the game, and Gruden proceeded to coach the game, a 20–9 loss. The emails were discovered in the investigation into the workplace culture of the Washington Football Team. However, a day later, additional emails were released by The New York Times that showed Gruden using misogynistic and homophobic language. After the publication of these emails, Gruden resigned. The Raiders failed to make any announcement after the resignation except to say that they had accepted the resignation and named Rich Bisaccia interim head coach. General manager Mike Mayock did comment on the situation two days later stating that he was "sad for the Gruden family," but also added that everyone is accountable for their actions. The same day, Mark Davis refused to directly comment on the situation, simply stating, "Ask the NFL. They have all the answers." It is believed that this statement was in reference to pressure from the NFL for the Raiders to fire Gruden and to "get" the Raiders. After the Raiders win over the Broncos in week six, Davis further commented that the Raiders do not stand for the kind of comments made by Gruden.

Gruden later filed a lawsuit against the NFL and Commissioner Roger Goodell alleging that they sought to ruin his career by releasing the emails.

==== Nassib comes out ====
In the offseason, defensive end Carl Nassib became the first active player to come out as gay. After playing in the Raiders’ week 1 game, he became the first openly gay player in NFL history to play in a game during the regular season.

==== Player controversies ====
The Raiders wound up releasing both of their first-round draft picks from the prior season due to notable off-field incidents. On November 2, wide receiver Henry Ruggs was involved in a fatal car crash that killed another driver and her dog, caused by driving under the influence. He was released by the team later that day after being booked into the Clark County Detention Center. Less than a week later on November 8, cornerback Damon Arnette was also released after the discovery of a video showing him brandishing firearms and making death threats.

On January 3, cornerback Nate Hobbs was arrested in Las Vegas for driving under the influence hours after a Week 17 win against the Indianapolis Colts.

=== Schedule ===
The Raiders' 2021 schedule was announced on May 12. The Raiders' game against the Cleveland Browns, originally scheduled for December 18, was postponed to December 20 due to positive COVID-19 cases in the Browns' organization.

| Week | Date | Opponent | Result | Record | Venue | Recap |
|---|---|---|---|---|---|---|
| 1 | September 13 | Baltimore Ravens | **W** 33–27 (OT) | 1–0 | Allegiant Stadium | Recap |
| 2 | September 19 | at Pittsburgh Steelers | **W** 26–17 | 2–0 | Heinz Field | Recap |
| 3 | September 26 | Miami Dolphins | **W** 31–28 (OT) | 3–0 | Allegiant Stadium | Recap |
| 4 | October 4 | at **Los Angeles Chargers** | **L** 14–28 | 3–1 | SoFi Stadium | Recap |
| 5 | October 10 | Chicago Bears | **L** 9–20 | 3–2 | Allegiant Stadium | Recap |
| 6 | October 17 | at **Denver Broncos** | **W** 34–24 | 4–2 | Empower Field at Mile High | Recap |
| 7 | October 24 | Philadelphia Eagles | **W** 33–22 | 5–2 | Allegiant Stadium | Recap |
| 8 | Bye | | | | | |
| 9 | November 7 | at New York Giants | **L** 16–23 | 5–3 | MetLife Stadium | Recap |
| 10 | November 14 | **Kansas City Chiefs** | **L** 14–41 | 5–4 | Allegiant Stadium | Recap |
| 11 | November 21 | Cincinnati Bengals | **L** 13–32 | 5–5 | Allegiant Stadium | Recap |
| 12 | November 25 | at Dallas Cowboys | **W** 36–33 (OT) | 6–5 | AT&T Stadium | Recap |
| 13 | December 5 | Washington Football Team | **L** 15–17 | 6–6 | Allegiant Stadium | Recap |
| 14 | December 12 | at **Kansas City Chiefs** | **L** 9–48 | 6–7 | Arrowhead Stadium | Recap |
| 15 | December 20 | at Cleveland Browns | **W** 16–14 | 7–7 | FirstEnergy Stadium | Recap |
| 16 | December 26 | **Denver Broncos** | **W** 17–13 | 8–7 | Allegiant Stadium | Recap |
| 17 | January 2 | at Indianapolis Colts | **W** 23–20 | 9–7 | Lucas Oil Stadium | Recap |
| 18 | January 9 | **Los Angeles Chargers** | **W** 35–32 (OT) | 10–7 | Allegiant Stadium | Recap |

Note: Intra-division opponents are in bold text.

=== Game summaries ===
==== Week 1: vs. Baltimore Ravens ====
Week 1: Baltimore Ravens at Las Vegas Raiders – Game summary

| Quarter | 1 | 2 | 3 | 4 | OT | Total |
|---|---|---|---|---|---|---|
| Ravens | 7 | 7 | 3 | 10 | 0 | **27** |
| **Raiders** | 0 | 10 | 0 | 17 | 6 | **33** |

at Allegiant Stadium, Paradise, Nevada

- Date: September 13
- Game time: 5:15 p.m. PDT
- Game weather: None (indoor stadium)
- Game attendance: 61,756
- Referee: Shawn Smith
- TV announcers (ESPN/ABC): Steve Levy, Brian Griese, Louis Riddick and Lisa Salters
- Recap, Game Book

Game information

**First quarter**

- BAL – Ty'Son Williams 35-yard run (Justin Tucker kick), 1:47. Ravens 7–0. **Drive: 6 plays, 65 yards, 2:59.**

**Second quarter**

- BAL – Marquise Brown 10-yard pass from Lamar Jackson (Justin Tucker kick), 8:52. Ravens 14–0. **Drive: 6 plays, 68 yards, 2:38.**
- LV – Josh Jacobs 2-yard run (Daniel Carlson kick), 4:14. Ravens 14–7. **Drive: 9 plays, 75 yards, 4:38.**
- LV – Daniel Carlson 34-yard field goal, 0:00. Ravens 14–10. **Drive: 9 plays, 48 yards, 1:12.**

**Third quarter**

- BAL – Justin Tucker 40-yard field goal, 8:24. Ravens 17–10. **Drive: 6 plays, 16 yards, 2:24.**

**Fourth quarter**

- LV – Josh Jacobs 15-yard run (Daniel Carlson kick), 9:18. Tied 17–17. **Drive: 5 plays, 41 yards, 2:36.**
- BAL – Latavius Murray 8-yard run (Justin Tucker kick), 6:04. Ravens 24–17. **Drive: 6 plays, 75 yards, 3:14.**
- LV – Darren Waller 10-yard pass from Derek Carr (Daniel Carlson kick), 3:44. Tied 24–24. **Drive: 9 plays, 75 yards, 2:20.**
- BAL – Justin Tucker 47-yard field goal, 0:37. Ravens 27–24. **Drive: 8 plays, 46 yards, 3:07.**
- LV – Daniel Carlson 55-yard field goal, 0:02. Tied 27–27. **Drive: 5 plays, 38 yards, 0:35.**

**Overtime**

- LV – Zay Jones 31-yard pass from Derek Carr, 3:38. Raiders 33–27. **Drive: 2 plays, 27 yards, 0:53.**

**Top passers**

- BAL – Lamar Jackson – 19/30, 235 yards, TD
- LV – Derek Carr – 34/56, 435 yards, 2 TD, INT

**Top rushers**

- BAL – Lamar Jackson – 12 rushes, 86 yards
- LV – Josh Jacobs – 10 rushes, 34 yards, 2 TD

**Top receivers**

- BAL – Sammy Watkins – 4 receptions, 96 yards
- LV – Darren Waller – 10 receptions, 105 yards, TD

In Week 1, the Raiders opened on Monday Night Football with fans in Allegiant Stadium for the first time in a home regular season game. The Baltimore Ravens arrived in Las Vegas after having suffered several key injuries to running backs in the week leading up to Week One.

The Raiders received the opening kickoff and moved into Baltimore territory before a shotgun snap that was not expected by Las Vegas quarterback Derek Carr led to a 15-yard loss. As a result of the play, the Raiders were forced to punt. The Ravens were unable to do much with the ball and punted as well. A three-and-out series by the Raiders gave the ball to the Ravens at their own 35. The Ravens moved into Raider territory, but were faced with a fourth and one at the Raider 35-yard line. Ty'Son Williams broke through the line on the fourth down play for a 35-yard touchdown run to give Baltimore a 7–0 lead. The teams exchanged punts on their next possessions before the Ravens moved into Raider territory again. Lamar Jackson hit Marquise Brown on a 10-yard touchdown pass with nine minutes remaining in the second quarter and it appeared the Raiders might get blown out. However, on the ensuing possession, Carr was finally able to connect with tight end Darren Waller and move the ball to the Ravens two-yard line before Josh Jacobs scored to cut the lead in half, 14–7. The Ravens again moved into Raider territory with less than two minutes left in the half, but were stopped short on fourth down and turned the ball over to Las Vegas. Carr quickly moved the Raiders to the Baltimore 14-yard line, but had to settle for a Daniel Carlson 34-yard field goal as the half ended leaving the score 14–10 at halftime.

In the second half, the team exchanged punts again before the Ravens connected on a 40-yard field goal by Justin Tucker to move the lead back to seven at 17–10. The Raiders looked to answer by moving in to Raven territory, but were stuffed on a fourth-and-one at the Raven 13. The teams again exchanged punts as the game moved to the fourth quarter. The Ravens took over with 13:23 remaining in the quarter, but Jackson scrambled and had the ball knocked out of his hands and fumbled with the Raiders' Denzel Perryman recovering the ball at the Baltimore 41. Four plays later, Jacobs scored on a 25-yard run to tie the game at 17. The Ravens quickly answered as Latavius Murray scored on an eight-yard touchdown run to give the Ravens a 24–17 lead with about six minutes remaining. Carr moved the Raiders down field and, with just under four minutes left, hit Waller for a 10-yard touchdown pass to again tie the game. Baltimore responded by moving into Raider territory, but were unable to get a first down on a third-down play at the Vegas 31 and were forced to settle for a field goal with 37 seconds remaining. Carr, with no timeouts, hit Bryan Edwards for a 20-yard gain on the first play of the ensuing possession. After a spike to stop the clock, Carr hit Edwards again for 18 yards to move the ball to the Raven 37. Carlson then hit a 55-yard field to tie the game at 27. With two second remaining in the quarter, the Ravens took a knee to settle for overtime.

In overtime, the Raiders won the toss and moved into Raven territory on a pass by Carr to Hunter Renfrow. Renfrow appeared to step out of bounds at least once on the 27-yard play, but no review was made. Two plays later, Carr, backpedaling to avoid the rush, threw a 33-yard touchdown pass to Edwards to apparently win the game. As players celebrated on the field, the play was reviewed and it was determined Edwards was down near the one-yard line, overturning the touchdown. After clearing the field, Carr was stuffed on sneak attempt. Rookie right tackle Alex Leatherwood then committed a false start penalty and the ball was moved back outside the five-yard line. Following an incompletion, Carr's next past went through the hands of Willie Snead and bounced off a DeShon Elliott's helmet before being intercepted by Anthony Averett in the end zone for a touchback. After the Ravens took over at the 20, Jackson fumbled again which was again recovered by the Raiders. Following a one-yard run to the Ravens' 26, the Raiders belatedly decided to attempt a field goal. However, due to the slow decision, Carlson did not get on the field in time and the Raiders, who had used their two timeouts on the prior possession, committed a delay of game penalty. Jon Gruden decided to not try the field goal on the next play and Carr, under pressure and backpedaling, threw to a wide open Zay Jones for a 31-yard touchdown to end the game.

The win moved the Raiders to 1–0 on the season. Carr threw for 435 yards and two touchdowns. Jacobs, who was limited with a foot injury, ran for 34 yards on 10 carries as the Raiders managed only 82 yards rushing in the game. Waller was targeted on a career-high 19 pass attempts and caught 10 for 105 yards and a touchdown.

Starting guard Denzelle Good left the game with a torn ACL, ending his season. Defensive tackle Gerald McCoy also suffered a knee injury that ended his season.

==== Week 2: at Pittsburgh Steelers ====
Week 2: Las Vegas Raiders at Pittsburgh Steelers – Game summary

| Quarter | 1 | 2 | 3 | 4 | Total |
|---|---|---|---|---|---|
| **Raiders** | 3 | 6 | 7 | 10 | **26** |
| Steelers | 0 | 7 | 0 | 10 | **17** |

at Heinz Field, Pittsburgh, Pennsylvania

- Date: September 19
- Game time: 1:00 p.m. EDT/10:00 a.m. PDT
- Game weather: Sunny, 79 °F (26 °C)
- Game attendance: 63,707
- Referee: Jerome Boger
- TV announcers (CBS): Ian Eagle, Charles Davis and Evan Washburn
- Recap, Game Book

Game information

**First quarter**

- LV – Daniel Carlson 46-yard field goal, 3:10. Raiders 3–0. **Drive: 5 plays, 12 yards, 2:34.**

**Second quarter**

- LV – Daniel Carlson 33-yard field goal, 9:34. Raiders 6–0. **Drive: 8 plays, 47 yards, 3:58.**
- PIT – JuJu Smith-Schuster 3-yard run (Chris Boswell kick), 6:25. Steelers 7–6. **Drive: 7 plays, 75 yards, 3:09.**
- LV – Daniel Carlson 41-yard goal, 0:02. Raiders 9–7. **Drive: 13 plays, 53 yards, 6:23.**

**Third quarter**

- LV – Foster Moreau 9-yard pass from Derek Carr (Daniel Carlson kick), 5:02. Raiders 16–7. **Drive: 7 plays, 82 yards, 4:09.**

**Fourth quarter**

- PIT – Najee Harris 25-yard pass from Ben Roethlisberger (Chris Boswell kick), 11:15. Raiders 16–14. **Drive: 5 plays, 80 yards, 1:41.**
- LV – Henry Ruggs 61-yard pass from Derek Carr (Daniel Carlson kick), 9:35. Raiders 23–14. **Drive: 5 plays, 75 yards, 1:40.**
- PIT – Chris Boswell 56-yard field goal, 3:42. Raiders 23–17. **Drive: 8 plays, 30 yards, 2:09.**
- LV – Daniel Carlson 45-yard field goal, 0:20. Raiders 26–17. **Drive: 7 plays, 30 yards, 3:22.**

**Top passers**

- LV – Derek Carr – 28/37, 382 yards, 2 TD
- PIT – Ben Roethlisberger – 27/40, 295 yards, TD, INT

**Top rushers**

- LV – Peyton Barber – 13 rushes, 32 yards
- PIT – Najee Harris – 10 rushes, 38 yards

**Top receivers**

- LV – Henry Ruggs – 5 receptions, 113 yards, TD
- PIT – Diontae Johnson – 9 receptions, 105 yards

The Raiders traveled to Pittsburgh for the 30th all-time meeting with the Steelers for the second game of the season. Both teams entered the game with identical 1–0 records. Raider running back Josh Jacobs was declared unable to play in the game, severely limiting the Raiders rushing attack.

The Steelers received the opening kick and moved to midfield before the Raider defense stiffened and forced a punt. The Raiders gained a first down on their first possession of the game, but could muster nothing further and were forced to punt as well. After a first down for the Steelers on their next possession, quarterback Ben Roethlisberger, under pressure, heaved a ball to the Vegas 46-yard line where it was intercepted by Trayvon Mullen and returned to the Steeler 39. The Raiders could do nothing with the ball as a shotgun snap that Derek Carr was not ready for preceded a fumbled snap and a false start by Raider rookie offensive tackle Alex Leatherwood. As a result, the Raiders settled for a Daniel Carlson 46-yard field goal to take the lead. The Steelers moved into Vegas territory on their next possession, but were faced with a fourth and four when Roethlisberger was pressured and threw an incomplete pass. The Raiders took possession early in the second quarter and again moved into Pittsburgh territory, but the drive stalled at the 15-yard line and the Raiders settled for another Carlson field goal to push the lead to 6–0. The Steelers quickly answered, going 75 yards on seven plays, capped off by a JuJu Smith-Schuster three-yard touchdown run to give the Steelers a 7–6 lead with just over six minutes remaining in the half. The Raiders answered with their own long drive, moving to the Steeler 17, but again settled for Carlson field goal to take a 9–7 lead at the half.

Getting the ball first in the second half, the Raiders moved to midfield, but were forced to punt. Following a Steeler punt, the Raiders moved into Pittsburgh territory before Carr hit Foster Moreau on a nine-yard touchdown pass to extend the lead to 16–7. On the play, Carr was hit on his right ankle and remained down for a few minutes before walking off the field. Carr did not miss a play thereafter however. The teams exchanged punts on their next possessions as the game moved into the fourth quarter. The Steelers moved quickly down field on their next possession, going 80 yards on only five plays before rookie running back Najee Harris caught a Roethlisberger short pass and ran 25 yards to dive into the end zone to draw the Steelers within two. The Raiders answered quickly with Carr hitting Henry Ruggs on a 61-yard touchdown score to push the lead to 23–14 with nine minutes remaining in the game. The Raider defense forced Pittsburgh to go three-and-out on the ensuing possession. The Raider offense attempted to chew up the clock on their next possession, but missing Jacobs, were forced to punt. Pittsburgh, trailing by two scores, moved into Raider territory, but were stopped at the Vegas 38 and settled for a Chris Boswell field goal to draw within six at 23–17. Looking to still run clock, but unable to do much running the ball, Carr hit Darren Waller on a 25-yard pass to move into Steeler territory on the next possession. The Raiders ground down the clock and, with 20 seconds remaining, Carlson hit his fourth field goal of the day putting the game out of reach 26–17. The Steelers were unable to score as the clock expired giving the Raiders the road win.

The win was the Raiders sixth in the last eight meetings against the Steelers. Carr threw for 382 yards and two touchdowns as the Raiders limited rushing attack without Jacobs managed only 52 yards on 25 rushes. The win moved the Raiders to 2–0 for the second consecutive season.

==== Week 3: vs. Miami Dolphins ====
Week 3: Miami Dolphins at Las Vegas Raiders – Game summary

| Quarter | 1 | 2 | 3 | 4 | OT | Total |
|---|---|---|---|---|---|---|
| Dolphins | 14 | 0 | 0 | 11 | 3 | **28** |
| **Raiders** | 2 | 10 | 7 | 6 | 6 | **31** |

at Allegiant Stadium, Paradise, Nevada

- Date: September 26
- Game time: 1:05 p.m. PDT
- Game weather: None (indoor stadium)
- Game attendance: 59,311
- Referee: Carl Cheffers
- TV announcers (CBS): Ian Eagle, Charles Davis and Evan Washburn
- Recap, Game Book

Game information

**First quarter**

- MIA – Elandon Roberts 85-yard interception return (Jason Sanders kick), 6:34. Dolphins 7–0.
- MIA – Malcolm Brown 24-yard run (Jason Sanders kick), 3:07. Dolphins 14–0. **Drive: 4 plays, 34 yards, 1:42.**
- LV – Casey Hayward tackled Jaylen Waddle in end zone for safety, 0:32. Dolphins 14–2.

**Second quarter**

- LV – Daniel Carlson 50-yard field goal, 11:36. Dolphins 14–5. **Drive: 9 plays, 31 yards, 3:56.**
- LV – Alec Ingold 1-yard pass from Derek Carr (Daniel Carlson kick), 1:56. Dolphins 14–12. **Drive: 10 plays, 95 yards, 4:24.**

**Third quarter**

- LV – Hunter Renfrow 12-yard pass from Derek Carr (Daniel Carlson kick), 7:17. Raiders 19–14. **Drive: 9 plays, 72 yards, 5:16.**

**Fourth quarter**

- LV – Peyton Barber 1-yard run (kick failed), 13:47. Raiders 25–14. **Drive: 11 plays, 84 yards, 6:05.**
- MIA – Jason Sanders 46-yard field goal, 8:30. Raiders 25–17. **Drive: 11 plays, 47 yards, 5:17.**
- MIA – Jacoby Brissett 1-yard run (Jacoby Brissett–Will Fuller pass), 0:02. Tied 25–25. **Drive: 13 plays, 82 yards, 3:20.**

**Overtime**

- LV – Daniel Carlson 38-yard field goal, 6:27. Raiders 28–25. **Drive: 8 plays, 55 yards, 3:33.**
- MIA – Jason Sanders 50-yard field goal, 2:49. Tied 28–28. **Drive: 11 plays, 48 yards, 3:38.**
- LV – Daniel Carlson 22-yard field goal, 0:00. Raiders 31–28. **Drive: 8 plays, 72 yards, 2:49.**

**Top passers**

- MIA – Jacoby Brissett – 32/49, 215 yards
- LV – Derek Carr – 26/43, 386 yards, 2 TD, INT

**Top rushers**

- MIA – Myles Gaskin – 13 rushes, 65 yards
- LV – Peyton Barber – 23 rushes, 111 yards, TD

**Top receivers**

- MIA – Mike Gesicki – 10 receptions, 86 yards
- LV – Bryan Edwards – 3 receptions, 89 yards

The Raiders returned home to face the Dolphins in Week Three. Josh Jacobs was again unable to play for the Raiders. Dolphin starting quarterback Tua Tagovailoa missed the game due to injured ribs.

Each team was forced to punt on their opening possession. The Raiders moved into Miami territory on their second possession of the game. After reaching the Miami 21, Derek Carr was intercepted by Dolphin linebacker Elandon Roberts. Roberts returned the interception 85 yards for the first touchdown of the game, giving the Dolphins a 7–0 lead. On the next possession, the Raiders moved to their own 34 and decided to go for it on fourth-and-one, but were stopped, giving the Dolphins a short field. Four plays later, Malcolm Brown scored on a 24-yard touchdown run and the Raiders were down 14–0 with just over three minutes remaining in the first quarter. The Raiders failed to answer on their next possession as penalties forced them to punt to the Dolphins, but a good punt and good coverage downed the ball inside the Miami one-yard line. On the final play of the first quarter, Dolphins quarterback Jacoby Brissett's short pass to Jaylen Waddle in the end zone was played well by Raiders cornerback Casey Hayward as he tackled Waddle in the end zone for a safety. As the quarter ended, the Raiders trailed 14–2. On the ensuing Raider possession, Vegas moved into Miami territory, but were forced to settle for a 50-yard field goal by Daniel Carlson. After a Miami punt, the Raiders moved deep into Miami territory and Carr hit Alec Ingold on a one-yard pass for a touchdown to bring the Raiders within two at 14–12. With less than two minutes to play in the half, the Dolphins moved into Raider territory, but had to settle for a 48-yard field goal attempt by Jason Sanders. The kick hit the left upright as the half expired leaving the score 14–12 at the half.

In the second half, the Dolphins were forced to punt on their first possession and the Raiders moved down the field on a nine-play drive capped off by a Carr 12-yard touchdown pass to Hunter Renfrow to give the Raiders a 19–14 lead. The Raider defense again forced a Dolphin punt and the Raiders moved into Miami territory as the third quarter ended. Three plays into the fourth quarter, Raider running back Peyton Barber scored on a one-yard touchdown run to give the Raiders a 25–14 lead. Looking to put the game out of reach, Carlson's point after attempt was no good and the lead remained 11. The Dolphins answered on their next possession as Sanders hit his first field goal of the game to narrow the lead to eight. Following a quick three-and-out for the Raiders, Miami moved into Vegas territory, but came up short on a fourth down play with four and a half minutes remaining in the half. The Raiders took over with a chance to run out the clock, but Carr was sacked on a third down play and Las Vegas was forced to punt. The Dolphins took over at their own 18 with 3:22 remaining and marched down the field to the Raiders one-yard line. With eight second remaining in the half, Brissett scrambled for the one-yard touchdown run to bring the Dolphins within two. Because of the earlier missed extra point by Carlson, the Dolphins went for two to tie the game and Brissett hit Will Fuller on a pass for the two-point conversion. With two seconds remaining, the Raiders choose to kneel and settle for overtime.

In their second overtime game of the season, the Raiders won the toss and moved to the Dolphin 20-yard line. However, two Carr incompletions resulted in Carlson kicking a 38-yard field goal to give the Raiders the 28–25 lead. Needing a field goal to keep the game going, Miami moved into Vegas territory, but settled for a 50-yard field goal to tie the game again. With the next score winning the game, Carr hit Bryan Edwards on a 34-yard pass to move to the Dolphin 46. A 27-yard run by Barber put the ball at the Miami 19. Three more runs by Barber moved the ball to the Miami six and following a Carr kneel-down, Carlson kicked a 22-yard field goal to give the Raiders the 31–28 win.

Peyton Barber ended up rushing for 111 yards and a touchdown filling in for Jacobs. The win moved the Raiders to 3–0 on the season.

==== Week 4: at Los Angeles Chargers ====
Week 4: Las Vegas Raiders at Los Angeles Chargers – Game summary

| Quarter | 1 | 2 | 3 | 4 | Total |
|---|---|---|---|---|---|
| Raiders | 0 | 0 | 14 | 0 | **14** |
| **Chargers** | 7 | 14 | 0 | 7 | **28** |

at SoFi Stadium, Inglewood, California

- Date: October 4
- Game time: 5:15 p.m. PDT
- Game weather: None (retractable roof closed)
- Game attendance: 70,240
- Referee: John Hussey
- TV announcers (ESPN): Steve Levy, Brian Griese, Louis Riddick and Lisa Salters
- Recap, Game Book

Game information

**First quarter**

- LAC – Donald Parham 4-yard pass from Justin Herbert (Tristan Vizcaino kick), 8:01. Chargers 7–0. **Drive: 12 plays, 75 yards, 6:59.**

**Second quarter**

- LAC – Jared Cook 10-yard pass from Justin Herbert (Tristan Vizcaino kick), 4:16. Chargers 14–0. **Drive: 6 plays, 80 yards, 3:35.**
- LAC – Austin Ekeler 14-yard pass from Justin Herbert (Tristan Vizcaino kick), 0:29. Chargers 21–0. **Drive: 9 plays, 69 yards, 2:15.**

**Third quarter**

- LV – Hunter Renfrow 10-yard pass from Derek Carr (Daniel Carlson kick), 9:01. Chargers 21–7. **Drive: 11 plays, 78 yards, 5:59.**
- LV – Darren Waller 3-yard pass from Derek Carr (Daniel Carlson kick), 1:44. Chargers 21–14. **Drive: 6 plays, 81 yards, 2:55.**

**Fourth quarter**

- LAC – Austin Ekeler 11-yard run (Tristan Vizcaino kick), 5:20. Chargers 28–14. **Drive: 10 plays, 58 yards, 5:18.**

**Top passers**

- LV – Derek Carr – 21/34, 196 yards, 2 TD, INT
- LAC – Justin Herbert – 25/38, 222 yards, 3 TD

**Top rushers**

- LV – Josh Jacobs – 13 rushes, 40 yards
- LAC – Austin Ekeler – 15 rushes, 117 yards, TD

**Top receivers**

- LV – Henry Ruggs III – 3 receptions, 60 yards
- LAC – Jared Cook – 6 receptions, 70 yards, TD

For the second time this season, the Raiders played on Monday Night Football, this time against the Chargers. The game was delayed for approximately half an hour due to lightning in the area despite the fact that SoFi Stadium has a roof.

The Chargers received the opening kick and moved methodically down the field. Reaching the Vegas four-yard line, Justin Herbert threw a touchdown pass to give the Chargers and early 7–0 lead. The Raiders only gained three yards on their first possession and were forced to punt to the Chargers. Neither team could manage much for the rest of the quarter as both teams punted on their next two possessions. In the second quarter, the offenses continued to struggle with only the Raiders managing a first down in the first seven minutes of the quarter. With Just under eight minutes remaining, the Chargers took over at their own 20. Six plays later, Herbert hit Jared Cook on a 10-yard pass to put San Diego up 14–0. The Raiders again were forced to punt without getting a first down and gave the ball to the Chargers with 2:44 remaining in the half. LA's offense again moved swiftly down the field and Herbert hit Austin Ekeler on a 14-yard touchdown pass to move the score to 21–0. Taking over with 24 seconds left in the half, the Raiders ran out the clock. The Raider offense, which had been so prolific in the first three weeks, managed only one first down and only 51 yards in the half.

Taking the opening possession of the third quarter, the Raider offense came alive as they moved into LA territory before Derek Carr hit Hunter Renfrow for a 10-yard touchdown to narrow the lead to 21–7. The Raider defense allowed the Chargers to move into Vegas territory, but got a sack on third down by Darius Philon to force a Charger punt. The Raider offense continued its better play in the half, moving to the Charger three before Carr hit Darren Waller for a touchdown to narrow the lead to seven. The Raiders again forced the Chargers to punt on their next possession and Vegas took over with 13:26 left in the game. Carr hit Henry Ruggs on the first play of the drive for a 51-yard gain to the Charger 35. However, the drive stalled there with Carr being sacked on third down. Daniel Carlson missed a 52-yard field goal attempt that would have narrowed the lead to four. The missed field goal gave the Chargers the ball at the Vegs 42. They quickly took advantage and Ekeler scored on an 11-yard run with just over five minutes remaining to effectively end the game. The Raiders moved to midfield on their next possession, but Carr was intercepted ending the drive. The Chargers moved to the Vegas 36 on their next possession and lined up for a field goal, but instead punted the ball, pinning the Raiders inside their 10. With less than two minutes remaining, the Raiders could not get a first down, turning the ball over to LA and the Chargers were able to kneel out the clock to defeat the Raiders 28–14.

Carr, who had thrown for over 380 yards in each of the first three games, was limited to 196 yards in the loss. Josh Jacobs, who returned to the lineup for the Raiders, rushed for 40 yards on 13 attempts as the Chargers stymied the Raider offense. The loss moved the Raiders to 3–1 on the season.

==== Week 5: vs. Chicago Bears ====
Week 5: Chicago Bears at Las Vegas Raiders – Game summary

| Quarter | 1 | 2 | 3 | 4 | Total |
|---|---|---|---|---|---|
| **Bears** | 0 | 14 | 0 | 6 | **20** |
| Raiders | 3 | 0 | 0 | 6 | **9** |

at Allegiant Stadium, Paradise, Nevada

- Date: October 10
- Game time: 1:05 p.m. PDT
- Game weather: None (indoor stadium)
- Game attendance: 59,122
- Referee: Craig Wrolstad
- TV announcers (CBS): Ian Eagle, Charles Davis and Evan Washburn
- Recap, Game Book

Game information

**First quarter**

- LV – Daniel Carlson 31-yard field goal, 4:00. Raiders 3–0. **Drive: 13 plays, 69 yards, 6:08.**

**Second quarter**

- CHI – Jesper Horsted 2-yard pass from Justin Fields (Cairo Santos kick), 13:11. Bears 7–3. **Drive: 10 plays, 72 yards, 5:49.**
- CHI – Damien Williams 4-yard run (Cairo Santos kick), 1:56. Bears 14–3. **Drive: 16 plays, 86 yards, 8:17.**

**Third quarter**

- No scoring plays

**Fourth quarter**

- LV – Josh Jacobs 1-yard run (pass failed), 9:01. Bears 14–9. **Drive: 16 plays, 74 yards, 8:19.**
- CHI – Cairo Santos 46-yard field goal, 2:45. Bears 17–9. **Drive: 10 plays, 57 yards, 6:16.**
- CHI – Cairo Santos 46-yard field goal, 0:56. Bears 20–9. **Drive: 4 plays, 2 yards, 0:59.**

**Top passers**

- CHI – Justin Fields – 12/20, 111 yards, TD
- LV – Derek Carr – 22/35, 206 yards, INT

**Top rushers**

- CHI – Khalil Herbert – 18 rushes, 75 yards
- LV – Josh Jacobs – 15 rushes, 48 yards, TD

**Top receivers**

- CHI – Darnell Mooney – 3 receptions, 35 yards
- LV – Hunter Renfrow – 6 receptions, 56 yards

The Raiders returned home to face the 2–2 Bears.

The Bears received the opening kick, but were unable to secure a first down and were forced to punt. The Raiders, likewise, were unable to get a first down and punted the ball back to the Bears. After the punt, the Raiders moved into Bear territory and Josh Jacobs was tackled at the Bear two-yard line. Another rush by Jacobs gave the Raiders a touchdown. However, multiple holding calls on the Raiders took the touchdown off the board and moved the Raiders back to the 12. Two incomplete passes later and Vegas settled for a 31-yard Daniel Carlson field goal to take a 3–0 lead. The Bears moved into Vegas territory on their next possession and quarterback Justin Fields hit Bear tight end Jesper Horsted for a two-yard touchdown pass to take a 7–3 lead with 13:16 remaining in the second half. Following a 32-yard catch and run by Jacobs, the Raiders moved to the Bear 27. On fourth and one, the Raiders chose to go for it and Jacobs was tackled for no gain, turning the ball over to the Bears. Taking over at their own 14 after an unnecessary roughness call after the previous play, the Bears moved deep into Las Vegas territory. After the two-minute warning, running back Damien Williams scored on a four-yard run to give the Bears the 14–3 lead. The Raiders, looking to answer with less than two minutes remaining, were unable to get a first down and were forced to punt. Chicago took over with less than a minute remaining, but Fields was tackled at the Raider 44 to end the half with the Bears ahead 14–3.

In the third quarter, the teams exchanged punts before Derek Carr was intercepted at the Raider 45. Chicago could not take advantage of the turnover, failing to gain a yard and punting back to the Raiders. Vegas was able to get a couple of first downs on their next possession, but were again forced to punt. Following a Chicago punt, Las Vegas moved into Bear territory. Carr rushed up the middle on a third and one play, gaining two yards and a first down, but remained on the turf with an injury. Carr was able to trot off the field, but was replaced by backup quarterback Nathan Peterman. Carr returned to the field following a few plays on the sideline and the Raiders moved to the Bear one-yard line. Jacobs went over the top to score with just over nine minutes remaining in the game. The Vegas two-point attempt failed, leaving the Raiders behind 14–9. The Bears moved into Vegas territory on their next possession and added a 46-yard field goal to extend their lead to 17–9. With just over two minutes remaining, the Raiders were unable to get a first down and failed to convert a fourth and five, turning the ball over to the Bears. Another 46-yard field goal put the game out of reach at 20–9 with 56 seconds remaining. The Raiders were unable to do anything on their next possession as time expired and the Bears won 20–9.

The Raider offense continued to struggle in their second consecutive loss. The Raiders only gained 249 yards in the loss. The Bears out-rushed the Raiders 143 to 71, but the Raider defense kept them in the game, yielding only 20 points.

The loss moved the Raiders to 3–2 on the season.

This marked Jon Gruden's final game as the head coach for the Raiders as he announced his resignation the following day amid the ongoing controversy regarding his racist, misogynistic, and homophobic emails he sent prior to rejoining the Raiders.

==== Week 6: at Denver Broncos ====
Week 6: Las Vegas Raiders at Denver Broncos – Game summary

| Quarter | 1 | 2 | 3 | 4 | Total |
|---|---|---|---|---|---|
| **Raiders** | 10 | 7 | 14 | 3 | **34** |
| Broncos | 7 | 0 | 3 | 14 | **24** |

at Empower Field at Mile High, Denver, Colorado

- Date: October 17
- Game time: 2:25 p.m. MDT/1:25 p.m. PDT
- Game weather: Sunny, 69 °F (21 °C)
- Game attendance: 76,854
- Referee: Ronald Torbert
- TV announcers (CBS): Andrew Catalon, James Lofton and Amanda Balionis
- Recap, Game Book

Game information

**First quarter**

- (11:54) LV – Henry Ruggs 48-yard pass from Derek Carr, (Daniel Carlson kick)
  **Raiders 7–0;** Drive: 6 plays, 75 yards, 3:06.
- (6:49) DEN – Tim Patrick 23-yard pass from Teddy Bridgewater, (Brandon McManus kick)
  **Tied 7–7;** Drive: 13 plays, 69 yards, 6:04.
- (2:40) LV – Daniel Carlson 50-yard field goal
  **Raiders 10–7;** Drive: 8 plays, 43 yards, 4:09.

**Second quarter**

- (0:30) LV – Kenyan Drake 31-yard pass from Derek Carr, (Daniel Carlson kick)
  **Raiders 17–7;** Drive: 5 plays, 82 yards, 0:31.

**Third quarter**

- (11:27) LV – Kenyan Drake 18-yard run, (Daniel Carlson kick)
  **Raiders 24–7;** Drive: 4 plays, 56 yards, 1:56.
- (2:40) DEN – Brandon McManus 32-yard field goal
  **Raiders 24–10;** Drive: 9 plays, 64 yards, 4:49.
- (0:07) LV – Josh Jacobs 3-yard run, (Daniel Carlson kick)
  **Raiders 31–10;** Drive: 5 plays, 42 yards, 2:12.

**Fourth quarter**

- (11:16) DEN – Courtland Sutton 12-yard pass from Teddy Bridgewater, (Brandon McManus kick)
  **Raiders 31–17;** Drive: 12 plays, 75 yards, 2:51.
- (7:57) LV – Daniel Carlson 30-yard field goal
  **Raiders 34–17;** Drive: 7 plays, 64 yards, 3:19.
- (1:12) DEN – Noah Fant 4-yard pass from Teddy Bridgewater, (Brandon McManus kick)
  **Raiders 31–24;** Drive: 8 plays, 86 yards, 3:51.

**Top passers**

- LV – Derek Carr – 18/27, 341 yards, 2 TD
- DEN – Teddy Bridgewater – 35/49, 334 yards, 3 TD, 3 INT

**Top rushers**

- LV – Josh Jacobs – 16 rushes, 53 yards, TD
- DEN – Javonte Williams – 11 rushes, 53 yards

**Top receivers**

- LV – Henry Ruggs – 3 receptions, 97 yards, TD
- DEN – Noah Fant – 9 receptions, 97 yards, TD

The Raiders next visited the Broncos with new interim head coach Rich Bisaccia at the helm. The teams entered the game with identical 3–2 records on the season.

The Raiders received the ball first and moved to midfield quickly. On third and two from the Denver 48, Derek Carr hit Henry Ruggs on a 48-yard touchdown to give Las Vegas the early 7–0 lead. Denver quickly answered as they moved into Raider territory and Bronco quarterback Teddy Bridgewater threw to Tim Patrick for a 23-yard score to tie the game at seven. On the ensuing Raider possession, Carr hit Hunter Renfrow on a 25-yard pass play to move into Denver territory. However, the drive stalled and the Raiders had to settle for a Daniel Carlson 50-yard field goal to retake the lead 10–7. On the next Denver possession, Bridgewater was intercepted by Brandon Facyson giving the Raiders the ball at midfield. As the game moved to the second quarter, the Raider drive stalled and they settled for a 43-yard field goal attempt by Carlson that hit the right upright leaving the score at 10–7. The teams exchanged three-and-outs on their next possessions. The Broncos moved to midfield with under five minutes remaining in the half, but were again forced to punt. Both teams again punted and the Raiders took over at their own 26 with 1:01 left in the half. Carr hit Darren Waller for a 31-yard gain on the drive to move the ball to the Denver 31. On the ensuing play, Carr hit Kenyan Drake on a 31-yard catch and run for the Raiders' second touchdown of the game, moving the score to 17–7. With only 30 seconds left in the half, Bridgewater was sacked by Maxx Crosby to end the half.

The Broncos were forced to punt again on their first possession of the third quarter. Carr quickly hit Josh Jacobs on a 29-yard pass play to move the ball into Denver territory. Drake then scored on an 18-yard run to increase the Raider lead to 24–7. The Broncos, looking to answer on the ensuing possession, moved into Vegas territory, but were stopped at the 14 and forced to settle for field goal to narrow the lead to 14. Following a three-and-out for the Raiders, Bridgewater fumbled near midfield and the Raiders recovered at the Denver 42. Five plays later, Jacobs ran in to the end zone from three yards out to extend the lead to 31–10 as the third quarter ended. Denver, trailing by 21, moved into Vegas territory before Bridgewater hit Courtland Sutton for a 12-yard touchdown to narrow the lead to 14 again. On the ensuing Raider possession, Carr hit Bryan Edwards on a 51-yard pass play to set up another Carlson field goal to move the lead to 17. With just under eight minutes remaining in the game, Bridgewater was intercepted again at the Vegas 20-yard line by Trevon Moehrig-Woodward who returned the interception to the Denver 45. The Raiders were unable to take advantage of the field position and were forced to punt, giving Denver the ball with 4:03 remaining in the game. Denver, in desperation mode, moved quickly into Vegas territory and Bridgewater hit Noah Fant for a four-yard touchdown pass to narrow the lead to 10 with 1:10 remaining. The Broncos attempted an onside kick on the ensuing kickoff and recovered the ball at the Denver 44. However, four plays later Bridgewater was intercepted again, this time by Johnathan Abram to seal the 34–24 win.

The Raiders, who had struggled offensively in the previous two games, gained 426 yards of offense against the Broncos as Carr threw for 341 yards and two touchdowns in the win.

The win moved the Raiders to 4–2 on the season and left them tied with the Chargers for first place in the division.

==== Week 7: vs. Philadelphia Eagles ====
Week 7: Philadelphia Eagles at Las Vegas Raiders – Game summary

| Quarter | 1 | 2 | 3 | 4 | Total |
|---|---|---|---|---|---|
| Eagles | 7 | 0 | 0 | 15 | **22** |
| **Raiders** | 0 | 17 | 13 | 3 | **33** |

at Allegiant Stadium, Paradise, Nevada

- Date: October 24
- Game time: 1:05 p.m. PDT
- Game weather: None (indoor stadium)
- Game attendance: 62,000
- Referee: Clete Blakeman
- TV announcers (Fox): Kenny Albert, Jonathan Vilma and Lindsay Czarniak
- Recap, Game Book

Game information

**First quarter**

- (11:01) PHI – Kenneth Gainwell 13-yard pass from Jalen Hurts, (Jake Elliott kick)
  **Eagles 7–0;** Drive: 8 plays, 67 yards, 3:59.

**Second quarter**

- (11:20) LV – Foster Moreau 18-yard pass from Derek Carr, (Daniel Carlson kick)
  **Tied 7–7;** Drive: 9 plays, 72 yards, 4:40.
- (1:38) LV – Josh Jacobs 8-yard run, (Daniel Carlson kick)
  **Raiders 14–7;** Drive: 10 plays, 96 yards, 4:26.
- (0:07) LV – Daniel Carlson 28-yard field goal
  **Raiders 17–7;** Drive: 7 plays, 19 yards, 1:27.

**Third quarter**

- (11:48) LV – Kenyan Drake 4-yard run, (Daniel Carlson kick)
  **Raiders 24–7;** Drive: 6 plays, 41 yards, 3:12.
- (6:15) LV – Bryan Edwards 1-yard pass from Derek Carr, (kick failed)
  **Raiders 30–7;** Drive: 7 plays, 50 yards, 2:46.

**Fourth quarter**

- (11:40) PHI – Boston Scott 1-yard run, (Jake Elliott kick)
  **Raiders 30–14;** Drive: 8 plays, 59 yards, 3:30.
- (7:22) LV – Daniel Carlson 39-yard field goal
  **Raiders 33–14;** Drive: 8 plays, 54 yards, 2:21.
- (3:50) PHI – Jalen Reagor 17-yard pass from Jalen Hurts, (Dallas Goedert–Jalen Hurts pass)
  **Raiders 33–22;** Drive: 8 plays, 75 yards, 3:27.

**Top passers**

- PHI – Jalen Hurts – 18/34, 236 yards, 2 TD
- LV – Derek Carr – 31/34, 323 yards, 2 TD, INT

**Top rushers**

- PHI – Jalen Hurts – 13 rushes, 61 yards
- LV – Josh Jacobs – 14 rushes, 69 yards, TD

**Top receivers**

- PHI – Dallas Goedert – 3 receptions, 70 yards
- LV – Foster Moreau – 6 receptions, 60 yards, TD

The Raiders returned home to face the Eagles for their second game with Rich Bisaccia as head coach. A win against the Eagles would put the Raider a half-game ahead of the Chargers (who had a bye in Week 7) in the AFC West.

The Eagles received the ball first and quickly moved down field before quarterback Jalen Hurts threw a 13-yard touchdown pass to Kenneth Gainwell to give the Eagles the early 7–0 lead. The Raiders quickly responded, moving into Philadelphia territory and down to the Eagles' nine-yard line. However, Derek Carr's third down pass was intercepted ending the Raiders' drive. Following a Philadelphia punt, the Raiders again moved into Philly territory and, Carr hit Foster Morrow on an 18-yard pass to tie the game at seven early in the second quarter. Following another Eagle punt, the Raiders again moved into Philly territory and Josh Jacobs scored another touchdown on an eight-yard run to give the Raiders the 14–7 lead. On the ensuing Eagles' possession, a bad snap resulted in a fumble recovered by the Raiders Jonathan Abram, setting the Raiders up at the Philadelphia 29. However, the Raiders drive stalled at the 10 and they settled for a Daniel Carlson 28-yard field goal to stretch the lead to 17–7 with only seven second remaining in the half. The Eagles kneeled on the next possession as the game went to half time.

On the opening kick of the second half, the Eagles attempted a surprise onside kick, but Raider fullback Alec Ingold recovered to set Vegas up at the Philly 41. Six plays, later Kenyan Drake, filling in for Jacobs who left in the first half with a chest injury, scored on a four-yard run to push the lead to 17. The Raider defense continued their strong play, forcing the Eagles to punt on their next possession and giving the Raiders the ball at midfield. The Raiders moved to the Eagles one before Carr hit Bryan Edwards for a touchdown, but the Carlson extra point hit the upright to leave the score at 30–7. In desperation mode, the Eagles moved to the Raider one, but again turned the ball over on a Hurts' fumble ending the drive. The Raiders were forced to punt on the ensuing possession and the Eagles took over as the quarter ended. Philly again moved into Raider territory and this time were able to score on a one-yard run to narrow the lead to 30–14. The Raiders turned to the run game on their next possession, moving to the Philadelphia 21, but were forced to settle for a Carlson field goal to extend the lead to 33–14. With 7:17 remaining in the game, Philadelphia added a touchdown pass by Jalen Hurts and succeeded on the two-point conversion to narrow the lead to 11, at 33–22. The ensuing onside kick was unsuccessful and the Raiders took over at the Philly 44. With 3:50 remaining, the Raiders looked to run out the clock, but were unable to get a first down and were forced to punt. With just over two minutes remaining, the Eagles were unable to move out of Philadelphia territory and turned the ball over on downs with 43 seconds remaining in the game. A Carr kneel down, ended the game as the Raiders won easily 33–22.

Carr connected on 31 of 34 passes in the win, throwing for 323 yards and two touchdowns. The Raiders rushed for 119 yards in the game even after Jacobs left the game with only 29 yards rushing.

The win moved the Raiders to 5–2 on the season entering their bye week.

==== Week 9: at New York Giants ====
Week 9: Las Vegas Raiders at New York Giants – Game summary

| Quarter | 1 | 2 | 3 | 4 | Total |
|---|---|---|---|---|---|
| Raiders | 7 | 6 | 3 | 0 | **16** |
| **Giants** | 7 | 3 | 7 | 6 | **23** |

at MetLife Stadium, East Rutherford, New Jersey

- Date: November 7
- Game time: 1:00 p.m. EST/10:00 a.m. PST
- Game weather: Fair, 54 °F (12 °C)
- Game attendance: 74,512
- Referee: Clay Martin
- TV announcers (CBS): Kevin Harlan, Trent Green and Melanie Collins
- Recap, Game Book

Game information

**First quarter**

- NYG – Evan Engram 30-yard pass from Daniel Jones (Graham Gano kick), 10:46. **Giants 7–0.** Drive: 7 plays, 75 yards, 4:14.
- LV – Hunter Renfrow 2-yard pass from Derek Carr (Daniel Carlson kick), 5:44. **Tied 7–7.** Drive: 10 plays, 73 yards, 5:02.

**Second quarter**

- LV – Daniel Carlson 25-yard field goal, 14:48. **Raiders 10–7.** Drive: 6 plays, 24 yards, 1:21.
- NYG – Graham Gano 35-yard field goal, 3:24. **Tied 10–10.** Drive: 9 plays, 43 yards, 5:14.
- LV – Daniel Carlson 32-yard field goal, 0:06. **Raiders 13–10.** Drive: 10 plays, 56 yards, 3:18.

**Third quarter**

- NYG – Xavier McKinney 41-yard interception return (Graham Gano kick), 13:28. **Giants 17–13.**
- LV – Daniel Carlson 25-yard field goal, 5:20. **Giants 17–16.** Drive: 15 plays, 85 yards, 8:08.

**Fourth quarter**

- NYG – Graham Gano 32-yard field goal, 14:07. **Giants 20–16.** Drive: 13 plays, 62 yards, 6:13.
- NYG – Graham Gano 38-yard field goal, 3:21. **Giants 23–16.** Drive: 6 plays, 30 yards, 1:47.

**Top passers**

- LV – Derek Carr – 30/46, 296 yards, TD, 2 INT
- NYG – Daniel Jones – 15/20, 110 yards, TD

**Top rushers**

- LV – Josh Jacobs – 13 rushes, 76 yards
- NYG – Devontae Booker – 21 rushes, 99 yards

**Top receivers**

- LV – Darren Waller – 7 receptions, 92 yards
- NYG – Evan Engram – 3 receptions, 38 yards, TD

Following their bye week, the Raiders traveled to face the Giants. In the week prior the game, Raiders wide receiver Henry Ruggs was involved in a car accident causing the death of another driver. Ruggs was charged with DUI causing death and several other counts stemming from the accident. Shortly thereafter, the Raiders released Ruggs.

The Giants got the ball first and quickly moved into Raider territory before Giant quarterback Daniel Jones hit Evan Engram on a 30-yard touchdown pass to give the Giants a 7–0 lead. The Raiders answered on their next possession as Derek Carr hit Hunter Renfrow for a two-yard touchdown pass to tie the game at seven. Following back-to-back punts, the Giants took over at their own 34. On the first play, Raider defensive end Yannick Ngakoue sacked Jones forcing a fumble that was recovered by Darius Philon. As the second quarter began, the Raider offense stalled at the Giant six and settled for a 25-yard field goal to take a 10–7 lead. Both teams punted on their next possessions before the Giants moved to the Raider 17, but were forced to settle for a field goal to tie the game at 10 with 3:28 left in the half. Vegas, looking to retake the lead, moved into Giant territory, but were stopped at the Giant 14-yard line and settled for another Carlson field goal to give the Raiders the 13–10 lead at the half.

On the first possession of the second half, Carr was intercepted by Giants defensive back Xavier McKinney at the Vegas 41. McKinney returned the interception for a touchdown to give the Giants a 17–13 lead. The Raiders answer with a 15 play, 85 yard drive that stalled at the Giants' seven and Carlson drew the Raiders within one with this third field goal of the game. The Giants answered with their own field goal early in the fourth quarter to extend the lead to 20–16. The Raiders again moved into New York territory, but Carlson missed a 25-yard field goal with 9:28 remaining in the game. The Giants moved to midfield on their next possession, but had to punt with 6:21 remaining. Looking to take the lead, Carr was intercepted again by McKinney near midfield on the second play of the ensuing possession. With 5:12 remaining, the Giants looked to take time off the clock before kicking a 38-yard field goal to move the lead to 23–16. Vegas took over with 3:21 remaining and moved into Giant territory. With 44 seconds remaining in the game, Carr was sacked and fumbled the ball at the Giant 20 and the Giants recovered effectively ending the game. New York was able to run out the clock as they won 23–16.

Carr completed 30 of 46 pass and threw for 296 yards, but turned the ball over three times including a pick-six. The Raider defense limited the Giants to only 245 yards in the game but the three turnovers committed by Carr proved to be costly .

The loss dropped the Raiders to 5–3 on the season and fell into a first place tie with the Chargers in the division.

==== Week 10: vs. Kansas City Chiefs ====
Week 10: Kansas City Chiefs at Las Vegas Raiders – Game summary

| Quarter | 1 | 2 | 3 | 4 | Total |
|---|---|---|---|---|---|
| **Chiefs** | 7 | 10 | 10 | 14 | **41** |
| Raiders | 0 | 7 | 7 | 0 | **14** |

at Allegiant Stadium, Paradise, Nevada

- Date: November 14
- Game time: 5:20 p.m. PST
- Game weather: None (indoor stadium)
- Game attendance: 62,125
- Referee: Bill Vinovich
- TV announcers (NBC): Al Michaels, Cris Collinsworth and Michele Tafoya
- Recap, Game Book

Game information

**First quarter**

- KC – Tyreek Hill 8-yard pass from Patrick Mahomes (Harrison Butker kick), 2:51. Chiefs 7–0. **Drive: 11 plays, 89 yards, 5:45.**

**Second quarter**

- LV – Hunter Renfrow 6-yard pass from Derek Carr (Daniel Carlson kick), 12:57. Tied 7–7. **Drive: 5 plays, 50 yards, 2:33.**
- KC – Harrison Butker 40-yard field goal, 8:24. Chiefs 10–7. **Drive: 9 plays, 53 yards, 4:33.**
- KC – Tyreek Hill 1-yard pass from Patrick Mahomes (Harrison Butker kick), 1:39. Chiefs 17–7. **Drive: 10 plays, 58 yards, 4:19.**

**Third quarter**

- LV – Bryan Edwards 37-yard pass from Derek Carr (Daniel Carlson kick), 12:08. Chiefs 17–14. **Drive: 5 plays, 75 yards, 2:52.**
- KC – Noah Gray 1-yard pass from Patrick Mahomes (Harrison Butker kick), 7:09. Chiefs 24–14. **Drive: 13 plays, 82 yards, 4:59.**
- KC – Harrison Butker 35-yard field goal, 0:57. Chiefs 27–14. **Drive: 8 plays, 56 yards, 4:37.**

**Fourth quarter**

- KC – Darrel Williams 38-yard pass from Patrick Mahomes (Harrison Butker kick), 13:11. Chiefs 34–14. **Drive: 7 plays, 56 yards, 1:59.**
- KC – Byron Pringle 22-yard pass from Patrick Mahomes (Harrison Butker kick), 7:39. Chiefs 41–14. **Drive: 7 plays, 80 yards, 4:09.**

**Top passers**

- KC – Patrick Mahomes – 35/50, 406 yards, 5 TD
- LV – Derek Carr – 25/35, 261 yards, 2 TD, INT

**Top rushers**

- KC – Darrel Williams – 11 rushes, 43 yards
- LV – Derek Carr – 3 rushes, 18 yards

**Top receivers**

- KC – Travis Kelce – 8 receptions, 119 yards
- LV – Bryan Edwards – 3 receptions, 88 yards, TD

The Raiders will return home for a game against the Chiefs on Sunday Night Football.

==== Week 11: vs. Cincinnati Bengals ====
Week 11: Cincinnati Bengals at Las Vegas Raiders – Game summary

| Quarter | 1 | 2 | 3 | 4 | Total |
|---|---|---|---|---|---|
| **Bengals** | 3 | 7 | 3 | 19 | **32** |
| Raiders | 3 | 3 | 0 | 7 | **13** |

at Allegiant Stadium, Paradise, Nevada

- Date: November 21
- Game time: 1:05 p.m. PST
- Game weather: None (indoor stadium)
- Game attendance: 61,712
- Referee: Jerome Boger
- TV announcers (CBS): Ian Eagle, Charles Davis and Evan Washburn
- Recap, Game Book

Game information

**First quarter**

- LV – Daniel Carlson 26-yard field goal, 10:37. Raiders 3–0. **Drive: 4 plays, 1 yard, 1:23.**
- CIN – Evan McPherson 54-yard field goal, 7:36. Tied 3–3. **Drive: 7 plays, 39 yards, 3:01.**

**Second quarter**

- LV – Daniel Carlson 47-yard field goal, 11:06. Raiders 6–3. **Drive: 8 plays, 32 yards, 3:44.**
- CIN – Joe Mixon 11-yard run (Evan McPherson kick), 4:15. Bengals 10–6. **Drive: 12 plays, 72 yards, 6:51.**

**Third quarter**

- CIN – Evan McPherson 53-yard field goal, 6:04. Bengals 13–6. **Drive: 9 plays, 50 yards, 5:34.**

**Fourth quarter**

- CIN – Evan McPherson 51-yard field goal, 13:17. Bengals 16–6. **Drive: 10 plays, 46 yards, 5:23.**
- LV – Foster Moreau 19-yard pass from Derek Carr (Daniel Carlson kick), 11:42. Bengals 16–13. **Drive: 3 plays, 75 yards, 1:35.**
- CIN – Ja'Marr Chase 6-yard pass from Joe Burrow (kick failed), 5:03. Bengals 22–13. **Drive: 12 plays, 62 yards, 6:39.**
- CIN – Joe Mixon 20-yard run (Evan McPherson kick), 3:51. Bengals 29–13. **Drive: 2 plays, 27 yards, 0:52.**
- CIN – Evan McPherson 47-yard field goal, 1:04. Bengals 32–13. **Drive: 4 plays, 2 yards, 0:19.**

**Top passers**

- CIN – Joe Burrow – 20/29, 148 yards, TD
- LV – Derek Carr – 19/27, 215 yards, TD, INT

**Top rushers**

- CIN – Joe Mixon – 30 rushes, 123 yards, 2 TD
- LV – Josh Jacobs – 9 rushes, 37 yards

**Top receivers**

- CIN – Tyler Boyd – 6 receptions, 49 yards
- LV – Darren Waller – 7 receptions, 116 yards

==== Week 12: at Dallas Cowboys ====
Thanksgiving Day games

Week 12: Las Vegas Raiders at Dallas Cowboys – Game summary

| Quarter | 1 | 2 | 3 | 4 | OT | Total |
|---|---|---|---|---|---|---|
| **Raiders** | 14 | 3 | 10 | 6 | 3 | **36** |
| Cowboys | 6 | 7 | 6 | 14 | 0 | **33** |

at AT&T Stadium, Arlington, Texas

- Date: November 25
- Game time: 3:30 p.m. CST/1:30 p.m. PST
- Game weather: None (retractable roof closed)
- Game attendance: 93,483
- Referee: Shawn Hochuli
- TV announcers (CBS): Jim Nantz, Tony Romo and Tracy Wolfson
- Recap, Game Book

Game information

**First quarter**

- LV – DeSean Jackson 56-yard pass from Derek Carr (Daniel Carlson kick), 11:45. Raiders 7–0. **Drive: 3 plays, 71 yards, 1:15.**
- DAL – Sean McKeon 10-yard pass from Dak Prescott (kick failed), 7:38. Raiders 7–6. **Drive: 9 plays, 75 yards, 4:07.**
- LV – Josh Jacobs 1-yard run (Daniel Carlson kick), 1:33. Raiders 14–6. **Drive: 8 plays, 60 yards, 3:44.**

**Second quarter**

- LV – Daniel Carlson 22-yard field goal, 8:46. Raiders 17–6. **Drive: 13 plays, 74 yards, 5:53.**
- DAL – Ezekiel Elliott 1-yard run (Greg Zuerlein kick), 0:25. Raiders 17–13. **Drive: 8 plays, 86 yards, 3:27.**

**Third quarter**

- LV – Marcus Mariota 3-yard run (Daniel Carlson kick), 7:13. Raiders 24–13. **Drive: 6 plays, 75 yards, 2:48.**
- DAL – Tony Pollard 100-yard kick return (run failed), 7:00. Raiders 24–19.
- LV – Daniel Carlson 46-yard field goal, 3:28. Raiders 27–19. **Drive: 9 plays, 48 yards, 3:32.**

**Fourth quarter**

- DAL – Greg Zuerlein 29-yard field goal, 12:00. Raiders 27–22. **Drive: 8 plays, 78 yards, 2:48.**
- LV – Daniel Carlson 30-yard field goal, 8:18. Raiders 30–22. **Drive: 6 plays, 63 yards, 3:42.**
- DAL – Dalton Schultz 32-yard pass from Dak Prescott (Dalton Schultz–Dak Prescott pass), 2:54. Tied 30–30. **Drive: 4 plays, 69 yards, 0:47.**
- LV – Daniel Carlson 56-yard field goal, 1:52. Raiders 33–30. **Drive: 5 plays, 37 yards, 1:02.**
- LV – Greg Zuerlein 45-yard field goal, 0:19. Tied 33–33. **Drive: 10 plays, 48 yards, 1:33.**

**Overtime**

- LV – Daniel Carlson 29-yard field goal, 4:28. Raiders 36–33. **Drive: 8 plays, 67 yards, 4:12.**

**Top passers**

- LV – Derek Carr – 24/39, 373 yards, TD
- DAL – Dak Prescott – 32/47, 375 yards, 2 TD

**Top rushers**

- LV – Josh Jacobs – 22 rushes, 87 yards, TD
- DAL – Tony Pollard – 10 rushes, 36 yards

**Top receivers**

- LV – Hunter Renfrow – 8 receptions, 134 yards
- DAL – Michael Gallup – 5 receptions, 106 yards

This was the Raiders' first Thanksgiving appearance after they moved to Las Vegas.

==== Week 13: vs. Washington Football Team ====
Week 13: Washington Football Team at Las Vegas Raiders – Game summary

| Quarter | 1 | 2 | 3 | 4 | Total |
|---|---|---|---|---|---|
| **Washington** | 7 | 0 | 0 | 10 | **17** |
| Raiders | 0 | 3 | 3 | 9 | **15** |

at Allegiant Stadium, Paradise, Nevada

- Date: December 5
- Game time: 1:05 p.m. PST
- Game weather: None (indoor stadium)
- Game attendance: 61,607
- Referee: Adrian Hill
- TV announcers (Fox): Kevin Burkhardt, Greg Olsen and Pam Oliver
- Recap, Game Book

Game information

**First quarter**

- WAS – Logan Thomas 7-yard pass from Taylor Heinicke (Brian Johnson kick), 9:39. Football Team 7–0. **Drive: 9 plays, 75 yards, 5:21.**

**Second quarter**

- LV – Daniel Carlson 52-yard field goal, 0:04. Football Team 7–3. **Drive: 10 plays, 46 yards, 1:37.**

**Third quarter**

- LV – Daniel Carlson 38-yard field goal, 4:52. Football Team 7–6. **Drive: 8 plays, 71 yards, 3:26.**

**Fourth quarter**

- WAS – Antonio Gibson 4-yard pass from Taylor Heinicke (Brian Johnson kick), 13:28. Football Team 14–6. **Drive: 9 plays, 75 yards, 6:24.**
- LV – Josh Jacobs 1-yard run (pass failed), 10:57. Football Team 14–12. **Drive: 5 plays, 75 yards, 2:31.**
- LV – Daniel Carlson 37-yard field goal, 2:22. Raiders 15–14. **Drive: 8 plays, 43 yards, 4:27.**
- WAS – Brian Johnson 48-yard field goal, 0:37. Football Team 17–15. **Drive: 8 plays, 44 yards, 1:45.**

**Top passers**

- WAS – Taylor Heinicke – 23/30, 196 yards, 2 TD, INT
- LV – Derek Carr – 28/38, 249 yards

**Top rushers**

- WAS – Antonio Gibson – 23 rushes, 88 yards
- LV – Josh Jacobs – 13 rushes, 52 yards, TD

**Top receivers**

- WAS – Logan Thomas – 3 receptions, 48 yards, TD
- LV – Hunter Renfrow – 9 receptions, 102 yards

==== Week 14: at Kansas City Chiefs ====
Week 14: Las Vegas Raiders at Kansas City Chiefs – Game summary

| Quarter | 1 | 2 | 3 | 4 | Total |
|---|---|---|---|---|---|
| Raiders | 0 | 3 | 6 | 0 | **9** |
| **Chiefs** | 14 | 21 | 3 | 10 | **48** |

at Arrowhead Stadium, Kansas City, Missouri

- Date: December 12
- Game time: 12:00 p.m. CST/10:00 a.m. PST
- Game weather: 50 °F (10 °C)
- Game attendance: 73,278
- Referee: Brad Allen
- TV announcers (CBS): Ian Eagle, Charles Davis and Evan Washburn
- Recap, Game Book

Game information

**First quarter**

- KC – Mike Hughes 23-yard fumble return (Harrison Butker kick), 14:43. Chiefs 7–0.
- KC – Darrel Williams 23-yard pass from Patrick Mahomes (Harrison Butker kick), 3:43. Chiefs 14–0. **Drive: 5 plays, 80 yards, 2:18.**

**Second quarter**

- KC – Clyde Edwards-Helaire 5-yard run (Harrison Butker kick), 12:13. Chiefs 21–0. **Drive: 7 plays, 80 yards, 4:22.**
- KC – Josh Gordon 1-yard pass from Patrick Mahomes (Harrison Butker kick), 6:17. Chiefs 28–0. **Drive: 9 plays, 39 yards, 5:02.**
- KC – Clyde Edwards-Helaire 6-yard run (Harrison Butker kick), 1:40. Chiefs 35–0. **Drive: 7 plays, 62 yards, 3:18.**
- LV – Daniel Carlson 26-yard field goal, 0:00. Chiefs 35–3. **Drive: 14 plays, 68 yards, 1:40.**

**Third quarter**

- KC – Harrison Butker 54-yard field goal, 8:25. Chiefs 38–3. **Drive: 10 plays, 41 yards, 6:35.**
- LV – Hunter Renfrow 4-yard pass from Derek Carr (kick failed), 3:29. Chiefs 38–9. **Drive: 10 plays, 69 yards, 4:56.**

**Fourth quarter**

- KC – Harrison Butker 37-yard field goal, 9:52. Chiefs 41–9. **Drive: 14 plays, 56 yards, 8:37.**
- KC – Derrick Gore 51-yard run (Harrison Butker kick), 7:19. Chiefs 48–9. **Drive: 1 play, 51 yards, 0:09.**

**Top passers**

- LV – Derek Carr – 33/45, 263 yards, TD, INT
- KC – Patick Mahomes – 20/24, 254 yards, 2 TD

**Top rushers**

- LV – Josh Jacobs – 9 rushes, 24 yards
- KC – Derrick Gore – 9 rushes, 66 yards, TD

**Top receivers**

- LV – Hunter Renfrow – 13 receptions, 117 yards, TD
- KC – Tyreek Hill – 4 receptions, 76 yards

==== Week 15: at Cleveland Browns ====
Week 15: Las Vegas Raiders at Cleveland Browns – Game summary

| Quarter | 1 | 2 | 3 | 4 | Total |
|---|---|---|---|---|---|
| **Raiders** | 7 | 3 | 0 | 6 | **16** |
| Browns | 0 | 0 | 7 | 7 | **14** |

at FirstEnergy Stadium, Cleveland, Ohio

- Date: December 20
- Game time: 5:00 p.m. EST/2:00 p.m. PST
- Game weather: Clear, 43 °F (6 °C)
- Game attendance: 67,431
- Referee: Craig Wrolstad
- TV announcers (NFLN): Joe Davis, Kurt Warner, Melissa Stark and Steve Wyche
- Recap, Game Book

Game information

**First quarter**

- LV – Bryan Edwards 5-yard pass from Derek Carr (Daniel Carlson kick), 3:41. Raiders 7–0. **Drive: 11 plays, 58 yards, 7:12.**

**Second quarter**

- LV – Daniel Carlson 24-yard field goal, 0:56. Raiders 10–0. **Drive: 13 plays, 56 yards, 5:18.**

**Third quarter**

- CLE – Nick Chubb 4-yard run (Chase McLaughlin kick), 4:33. Raiders 10–7. **Drive: 6 plays, 47 yards, 2:40.**

**Fourth quarter**

- LV – Daniel Carlson 40-yard field goal, 14:46. Raiders 13–7. **Drive: 10 plays, 52 yards, 4:47.**
- CLE – Harrison Bryant 6-yard pass from Nick Mullens (Chase McLaughlin kick), 3:45. Browns 14–13. **Drive: 14 plays, 80 yards, 8:22.**
- LV – Daniel Carlson 48-yard field goal, 0:00. Raiders 16–14. **Drive: 8 plays, 41 yards, 1:50.**

**Top passers**

- LV – Derek Carr – 25/38, 236 yards, TD, INT
- CLE – Nick Mullens – 20/30, 147 yards, TD

**Top rushers**

- LV – Josh Jacobs – 15 rushes, 52 yards
- CLE – Nick Chubb – 23 rushes, 91 yards, TD

**Top receivers**

- LV – Zay Jones – 6 receptions, 67 yards
- CLE – Donovan Peoples-Jones – 4 receptions, 48 yards

==== Week 16: vs. Denver Broncos ====
Week 16: Denver Broncos at Las Vegas Raiders – Game summary

| Quarter | 1 | 2 | 3 | 4 | Total |
|---|---|---|---|---|---|
| Broncos | 0 | 13 | 0 | 0 | **13** |
| **Raiders** | 0 | 7 | 7 | 3 | **17** |

at Allegiant Stadium, Paradise, Nevada

- Date: December 26
- Game time: 1:25 p.m. PST
- Game weather: None (indoor stadium)
- Game attendance: 60,972
- Referee: Scott Novak
- TV announcers (CBS): Greg Gumbel, Tiki Barber and AJ Ross
- Recap, Game Book

Game information

**First quarter**

- No scoring plays.

**Second quarter**

- LV – Hunter Renfrow 10-yard pass from Derek Carr (Daniel Carlson kick), 11:01. Raiders 7–0. **Drive: 14 plays, 76 yards, 7:24.**
- DEN – Brandon McManus 49-yard field goal, 7:24. Raiders 7–3. **Drive: 5 plays, 44 yards, 3:37.**
- DEN – Brandon McManus 55-yard field goal, 0:32. Raiders 7–6. **Drive: 4 plays, 4 yards, 1:28.**
- DEN – Javonte Williams 1-yard run (Brandon McManus kick), 0:15. Broncos 13–7. **Drive: 1 play, 1 yard, 0:03.**

**Third quarter**

- LV – Peyton Barber 5-yard run (Daniel Carlson kick), 10:22. Raiders 14–13. **Drive: 9 plays, 75 yards, 4:38.**

**Fourth quarter**

- LV – Daniel Carlson 41-yard field goal, 7:35. Raiders 17–13. **Drive: 13 plays, 32 yards, 7:38.**

**Top passers**

- DEN – Drew Lock – 15/22, 153 yards
- LV – Derek Carr – 20/25, 201 yards, TD, INT

**Top rushers**

- DEN – Javonte Williams – 7 rushes, 12 yards, TD
- LV – Josh Jacobs – 27 rushes, 129 yards

**Top receivers**

- DEN – Jerry Jeudy – 3 receptions, 60 yards
- LV – Foster Moreau – 4 receptions, 67 yards

==== Week 17: at Indianapolis Colts ====
Week 17: Las Vegas Raiders at Indianapolis Colts – Game summary

| Quarter | 1 | 2 | 3 | 4 | Total |
|---|---|---|---|---|---|
| **Raiders** | 7 | 6 | 0 | 10 | **23** |
| Colts | 0 | 10 | 7 | 3 | **20** |

at Lucas Oil Stadium, Indianapolis, Indiana

- Date: January 2
- Game time: 1:00 p.m. EST/10:05 a.m. PST
- Game weather: None (retractable roof closed)
- Game attendance: 65,985
- Referee: Brad Rogers
- TV announcers (Fox): Kenny Albert, Jonathan Vilma and Sara Walsh
- Recap, Game Book

Game information

**First quarter**

- LV – Josh Jacobs 2-yard run (Daniel Carlson kick), 7:51. Raiders 7–0. **Drive: 12 plays, 75 yards, 7:09.**

**Second quarter**

- LV – Daniel Carlson 47-yard field goal, 14:12. Raiders 10–0. **Drive: 7 plays, 6 yards, 3:30.**
- IND – Michael Badgley 46-yard field goal, 10:07. Raiders 10–3. **Drive: 7 plays, 47 yards, 4:05.**
- LV – Daniel Carlson 44-yard field goal, 1:47. Raiders 13–3. **Drive: 9 plays, 31 yards, 4:30.**
- IND – Jonathan Taylor 1-yard run (Michael Badgley kick), 0:01. Raiders 13–10. **Drive: 10 plays, 60 yards, 1:46.**

**Third quarter**

- IND – T. Y. Hilton 45-yard pass from Carson Wentz (Michael Badgley kick), 11:28. Colts 17–13. **Drive: 6 plays, 75 yards, 3:32.**

**Fourth quarter**

- LV –Hunter Renfrow 11-yard pass from Derek Carr (Daniel Carlson kick), 11:18. Raiders 20–17. **Drive: 6 plays, 62 yards, 3:21.**
- IND – Michael Badgley 41-yard field goal, 1:56. Tied 20–20. **Drive: 14 plays, 53 yards, 9:22.**
- LV – Daniel Carlson 33-yard field goal, 0:00. Raiders 23–20. **Drive: 10 plays, 60 yards, 1:56.**

**Top passers**

- LV – Derek Carr – 24/31, 255 yards, TD, 2 INT
- IND – Carson Wentz – 16/27, 148 yards, TD

**Top rushers**

- LV – Josh Jacobs – 16 rushes, 63 yards, TD
- IND – Jonathan Taylor – 20 rushes, 108 yards, TD

**Top receivers**

- LV – Zay Jones – 8 receptions, 120 yards
- IND – Michael Pittman Jr. – 6 receptions, 47 yards

On December 28, legendary former Raiders head coach John Madden died at the age of 85. The team honored him with a decal on their helmets.

The Raiders controlled their own destiny entering the game against the Colts in Indianapolis; if the Raiders won their two remaining games, they would be in the playoffs.

The Raiders started the game well, moving quickly into Colts' territory before Jacobs scored on a two-yard run to give LV the 7–0 lead. Following an Indianapolis punt, Carr threw a long pass to Jackson, but the pass was intercepted at the Indy 14-yard line. Following a 12-yard return, the Colts took over at their own 26. After a first down, the Raider defense again forced a punt giving Vegas the ball with 2:42 remaining in the quarter. The Raiders moved into Indy territory, but Carr was sacked on the first play of the second quarter and the Vegas was forced to settle for 47-yard field goal to extend the lead to 10–0. The Indy running game got going on the ensuing possession as Jonathan Taylor moved the Colts inside the Raider 30. The defense then stepped up to stop the drive and the Colts settled for a 46-yard field goal to draw within seven with 10 minutes left in the half. The teams exchanged punts before the Raiders moved into Colts' territory as the half wound down. With two mites remaining in the half, the offense again stalled and following a sack of Carr on third down, had to settle for another Carlson field goal, this time from 44 yards to extend the lead to 13–3. With 1:47 left in the half, the Colts quickly moved into Raider territory before Taylor scored from one yard out with one second left in the half. The touchdown narrowed Vegas's halftime lead to three.

Starting with the ball in the third quarter, the Colts moved efficiently into Raider territory before Carson Wentz threw a 45-yard touchdown pass to give the Colts a 17–13 lead. Carr was intercepted again on the next possession, ending the Raider drive at midfield. The Raider defense, however, limited the damage, only allowing one first down and forcing the Colts to punt. Taking over with 4:27 left in the quarter, the Raiders drive stalled at their own 43 and they were forced to punt. As the Colts took over to start the fourth quarter, the Vegas defense again limited the Colts to a quick three-and-out. On the ensuing possession, the Raiders moved into Indy territory on a 42-yard pass from Carr to Jones. The Raiders then moved to the Indy 16, but came up short on third down. Facing a fourth and two, the Raiders went for it and Carr hit Renfrow on an 11-yard touchdown pass to retake the lead at 20–17. The Colts next drive encompassed 14 plays and over nine minutes, but they were stopped short at the Vegas 22. A field goal tied the game at 20 with 1:56 left in the game. After reaching midfield, Carr hit Renfrow on what appeared to be a 48-yard touchdown pass, but upon review, Renfrow was ruled down at the Indy 24. Three short runs by Jacobs set up Carlson for a field goal attempt with two seconds remaining. The 33-yard field goal was good, giving the Raiders the 23–20 win.

The win kept the Raiders playoff hopes alive as they improved to 9–7 on the season. The Raider defense played well, limiting the Colts to only 262 yards, only 148 through the air.

==== Week 18: vs. Los Angeles Chargers ====
Week 18: Los Angeles Chargers at Las Vegas Raiders – Game summary

| Quarter | 1 | 2 | 3 | 4 | OT | Total |
|---|---|---|---|---|---|---|
| Chargers | 0 | 14 | 0 | 15 | 3 | **32** |
| **Raiders** | 10 | 7 | 3 | 9 | 6 | **35** |

at Allegiant Stadium, Paradise, Nevada

- Date: January 9
- Game time: 5:20 p.m. PST
- Game weather: None (indoor stadium)
- Game attendance: 62,068
- Referee: Clete Blakeman
- TV announcers (NBC): Al Michaels, Cris Collinsworth and Michele Tafoya
- Recap, Game Book

Game information

**First quarter**

- LV – Daniel Carlson 24-yard field goal, 10:50. Raiders 3–0. **Drive: 9 plays, 61 yards, 4:10.**
- LV – Hunter Renfrow 12-yard pass from Derek Carr (Daniel Carlson kick), 3:14. Raiders 10–0. **Drive: 6 plays, 23 yards, 3:30.**

**Second quarter**

- LAC – Austin Ekeler 14-yard run (Dustin Hopkins kick), 12:42. Raiders 10–7. **Drive: 14 plays, 75 yards, 5:32.**
- LAC – Austin Ekeler 14-yard pass from Justin Herbert (Dustin Hopkins kick), 1:52. Chargers 14–10. **Drive: 13 plays, 90 yards, 7:02.**
- LV – Josh Jacobs 1-yard run (Daniel Carlson kick), 0:37. Raiders 17–14. **Drive: 7 plays, 75 yards, 1:15.**

**Third quarter**

- LV – Daniel Carlson 31-yard field goal, 8:03. Raiders 20–14. **Drive: 4 plays, 4 yards, 0:49.**

**Fourth quarter**

- LV – Hunter Renfrow 2-yard pass from Derek Carr (pass failed), 14:14. Raiders 26–14. **Drive: 13 plays, 83 yards, 7:17.**
- LV – Daniel Carlson 52-yard field goal, 8:23. Raiders 29–14. **Drive: 8 plays, 30 yards, 4:32.**
- LAC – Josh Palmer 23-yard pass from Justin Herbert (Austin Ekeler–Justin Herbert pass), 4:28. Raiders 29–22. **Drive: 14 plays, 75 yards, 3:55.**
- LAC – Mike Williams 12-yard pass from Justin Herbert (Dustin Hopkins kick), 0:00. Tied 29–29. **Drive: 19 plays, 83 yards, 2:06.**

**Overtime**

- LV – Daniel Carlson 40-yard field goal, 7:09. Raiders 32–29. **Drive: 7 plays, 53 yards, 2:51.**
- LAC – Dustin Hopkins 41-yard field goal, 4:30. Tied 32–32. **Drive: 8 plays, 52 yards, 2:39.**
- LV – Daniel Carlson 47-yard field goal, 0:00. Raiders 35–32. **Drive: 8 plays, 46 yards, 4:30.**

**Top passers**

- LAC – Justin Herbert – 34/64, 383 yards, 3 TD, INT
- LV – Derek Carr – 20/36, 186 yards, 2 TD

**Top rushers**

- LAC – Austin Ekeler – 16 rushes, 64 yards, TD
- LV – Josh Jacobs – 26 rushes, 132 yards, TD

**Top receivers**

- LAC – Mike Williams – 9 receptions, 119 yards, TD
- LV – Bryan Edwards – 4 receptions, 63 yards

Entering the week, the Raiders needed a win against the Chargers to make the playoffs. The NFL "flexed" the Raiders' game to Sunday night because the winner of the game would be in the playoffs. However, the Raiders could still make the playoffs if the Colts lost to Jacksonville and the Steelers lost. Both of those games occurred earlier in the day, with the Colts losing and the Steelers winning. As a result, a tie in the game against the Chargers would result in both the Raiders and Chargers making the playoffs. Prior to the game, both teams were asked about the possibility of settling for the tie; Raiders' head coach Rich Bassacia said he would do anything necessary to make the playoffs.

The Raiders began with the ball and moved deep into Charger territory on a Derek Carr pass to Foster Moreau, who fumbled the ball at the Charger seven. Luckily for the Raiders, the ball bounced out of bounds at the one-yard line, setting the Raiders up at the seven. Following a holding penalty on the Chargers, the ball moved to the three, but the Raiders could get no farther and settled for a 24-yard Daniel Carlson field goal to take the early 3–0 lead. The Chargers quickly went three-and-out on the ensuing possession, giving the Raiders the ball at their 24. After a first down, Vegas also was forced to punt. However, on the punt, Chargers' returner Andre Roberts, fumbled the ball and the Raiders recovered at the LA 23. Three plays later, Vegas faced a fourth and two at the Charger 15, but Carr hit Zay Jones for the first down. Two play later, Carr hit Hunter Renfrow for a 12-yard touchdown pass to extend the Raiders' lead to 10–0 with 3:34 left in the first half. As the game moved into the second quarter, the Chargers moved into Raider territory on a 14-play drive capped off by Austin Ekeler's 14-yard touchdown run to narrow the lead to three. After a punt by the Raiders, LA again moved into LV territory and Justin Herbert capped off the drive with a 14-yard touchdown pass to Ekeler to give the Chargers a 14–10 lead. With 1:52 left in the half, the Raiders moved to the Charger 42 when Carr threw a long incomplete pass into the end zone. However, the Chargers were called for pass interference on the play, giving the Raiders the ball at one-yard line. Josh Jacobs scored on the next play to give the Raiders a 17–14 lead with 37 seconds left in the half. The Chargers could not get a first down and punted the ball to the Raiders with 10 seconds remaining. Vegas decided to kneel down to end the half ahead by three.

In the third quarter, the Chargers moved into Vegas territory before a sack by Maxx Crosby forced LA to settle for a 51-yard field goal attempt that went wide leaving the Raiders ahead by three. Following a punt by the Raiders, the Chargers faced a fourth and one from their own 18 and decided to go for it. Ekeler was dropped for a loss and the Raiders took over at the Charger 16. However, a short run and two incompletions sent Carlson on to the field for his second field goal of the night. With the score 20–14, the Chargers were forced to punt after a three-and-out. Taking over with 6:31 left in the third quarter, the Raiders moved deep into LA territory and, on the second play of the fourth quarter, Carr hit Renfrow for his second touchdown of the game. The touchdown extended the Raiders lead to 26–14. Vegas attempted a two-point conversion to move the lead to 14, but the pass to Renfrow fell short leaving the Raiders ahead by 12. On the ensuing possession, Herbert was intercepted at the Vegas 36, giving the Raiders the ball back with 12:55 left in the fourth quarter. Vegas moved to the LA 34, but got no further and settled for Carlson's third field goal of the game and extend the lead to 29–14. Taking over with 8:23 left in the fourth, the Chargers moved down the field on a 14-play drive that ended with Herbert hitting Josh Palmer for a 23-yard touchdown pass. The ensuing two-point conversion was good, narrowing the Raider lead to 29–22 with 4:28 left. Needing to burn the clock, the Raiders failed to get a first down as Carr was sacked and fumbled on third down. The ball was recovered by the Raiders, but resulted in a punt and setting LA up at their own 17 with 2:06 left in the quarter. The Chargers faced three third downs, converting on all of them, one on a penalty by the Raiders, and reached the Vegas 12 with five seconds remaining. Herbert then hit Mike Williams for the touchdown as time expired and the extra point tied the game at 29.

With both teams set to make the playoffs in the event of a tie, the Raiders turned to Josh Jacobs and moved to the LA 22. However, they could move no further and settled for Carlson's fourth field goal of the game to push the lead to three. LA, needing a field goal to extend the game, moved into Raider territory, but their drive also stalled and a 41-yard field goal with 4:30 left in the overtime tied the game again at 32. Vegas, playing conservatively, moved slowly into Charger territory and three straight runs by Jacobs moved the ball to the Chargers' 29 with less than 30 seconds remaining. The Raiders let the clock run down to two seconds and Carlson hit his fifth field goal of the game as time expired to give the Raiders the win.

The win eliminated the Chargers from the playoffs and put the Steelers into the playoffs as well. With the win, the Raiders received the fifth seed in the AFC playoffs and would play Cincinnati in the wildcard round of the playoffs.

=== Standings ===
==== Division ====
AFC West
| | W | L | T | PCT | DIV | CONF | PF | PA | STK |
|---|---|---|---|---|---|---|---|---|---|
| ^{(2)} Kansas City Chiefs | 12 | 5 | 0 | .706 | 5–1 | 7–5 | 480 | 364 | W1 |
| ^{(5)} Las Vegas Raiders | 10 | 7 | 0 | .588 | 3–3 | 8–4 | 374 | 439 | W4 |
| Los Angeles Chargers | 9 | 8 | 0 | .529 | 3–3 | 6–6 | 474 | 459 | L1 |
| Denver Broncos | 7 | 10 | 0 | .412 | 1–5 | 3–9 | 335 | 322 | L4 |

==== Conference ====
AFC
| # | Team | Division | W | L | T | PCT | DIV | CONF | SOS | SOV | STK |
|---|---|---|---|---|---|---|---|---|---|---|---|
**Division winners**
| 1 (Note: Tennessee finished ahead of Kansas City based on head-to-head victory, claiming the No. 1 seed.) | Tennessee Titans | South | 12 | 5 | 0 | .706 | 5–1 | 8–4 | .472 | .480 | W3 |
| 2 | Kansas City Chiefs | West | 12 | 5 | 0 | .706 | 5–1 | 7–5 | .538 | .517 | W1 |
| 3 | Buffalo Bills | East | 11 | 6 | 0 | .647 | 5–1 | 7–5 | .472 | .428 | W4 |
| 4 | Cincinnati Bengals | North | 10 | 7 | 0 | .588 | 4–2 | 8–4 | .472 | .462 | L1 |
**Wild cards**
| 5 (Note: Las Vegas claimed the No. 5 seed over New England based on win percentage in common games (5–1 vs. 2–4 against: Miami, Dallas, LA Chargers, Cleveland, and Indianapolis).) | Las Vegas Raiders | West | 10 | 7 | 0 | .588 | 3–3 | 8–4 | .510 | .515 | W4 |
| 6 | New England Patriots | East | 10 | 7 | 0 | .588 | 3–3 | 8–4 | .481 | .394 | L1 |
| 7 | Pittsburgh Steelers | North | 9 | 7 | 1 | .559 | 4–2 | 7–5 | .521 | .490 | W2 |
**Did not qualify for the postseason**
| 8 (Note: Indianapolis finished ahead of Miami and Los Angeles based on conference record (7–5 vs. 6–6).) | Indianapolis Colts | South | 9 | 8 | 0 | .529 | 3–3 | 7–5 | .495 | .431 | L2 |
| 9 (Note: Miami finished ahead of LA Chargers based on win percentage in common games (5–1 vs. 2–4 against: New England, Las Vegas, Houston, Baltimore, and NY Giants).) | Miami Dolphins | East | 9 | 8 | 0 | .529 | 4–2 | 6–6 | .464 | .379 | W1 |
| 10 | Los Angeles Chargers | West | 9 | 8 | 0 | .529 | 3–3 | 6–6 | .510 | .500 | L1 |
| 11 (Note: Cleveland finished ahead of Baltimore based on division record (3–3 vs. 1–5).) | Cleveland Browns | North | 8 | 9 | 0 | .471 | 3–3 | 5–7 | .514 | .415 | W1 |
| 12 | Baltimore Ravens | North | 8 | 9 | 0 | .471 | 1–5 | 5–7 | .531 | .460 | L6 |
| 13 | Denver Broncos | West | 7 | 10 | 0 | .412 | 1–5 | 3–9 | .484 | .357 | L4 |
| 14 (Note: NY Jets finished ahead of Houston based on head-to-head victory.) | New York Jets | East | 4 | 13 | 0 | .235 | 0–6 | 4–8 | .512 | .426 | L2 |
| 15 | Houston Texans | South | 4 | 13 | 0 | .235 | 3–3 | 4–8 | .498 | .397 | L2 |
| 16 | Jacksonville Jaguars | South | 3 | 14 | 0 | .176 | 1–5 | 3–9 | .512 | .569 | W1 |
**Tiebreakers** (Note: When breaking ties for three or more teams under the NFL's rules, they are first broken within divisions, then comparing only the highest-ranked remaining team from each division.)

== Postseason ==
=== Schedule ===
| Round | Date | Opponent (seed) | Result | Record | Venue | Recap |
|---|---|---|---|---|---|---|
| Wild Card | January 15 | at Cincinnati Bengals (4) | L 19–26 | 0–1 | Paul Brown Stadium | Recap |

=== Game summaries ===
==== AFC Wild Card Playoffs: at (4) Cincinnati Bengals ====
AFC Wild Card Playoffs: (5) Las Vegas Raiders at (4) Cincinnati Bengals – Game summary

| Quarter | 1 | 2 | 3 | 4 | Total |
|---|---|---|---|---|---|
| Raiders | 3 | 10 | 0 | 6 | 19 |
| Bengals | 10 | 10 | 3 | 3 | 26 |

at Paul Brown Stadium, Cincinnati, Ohio

- Date: January 15, 2022
- Game time: 4:35 p.m. EST/1:35 p.m. PST
- Game weather: Cloudy, 32 °F (0 °C)
- Game attendance: 66,277
- Referee: Jerome Boger
- TV announcers (NBC): Mike Tirico, Drew Brees and Kathryn Tappen
- Recap, Game Book

Game information

First quarter

- LV – Daniel Carlson 47-yard field goal, 9:23. Raiders 3–0. Drive: 10 plays, 47 yards, 5:37.
- CIN – C. J. Uzomah 7-yard pass from Joe Burrow (Evan McPherson kick), 4:31. Bengals 7–3. Drive: 10 plays, 75 yards, 4:52.
- CIN – Evan McPherson 31-yard field goal, 1:15. Bengals 10–3. Drive: 4 plays, 2 yards, 1:46.

Second quarter

- CIN – Evan McPherson 30-yard field goal, 10:20. Bengals 13–3. Drive: 8 plays, 33 yards, 3:52.
- LV – Daniel Carlson 28-yard field goal, 7:55. Bengals 13–6. Drive: 6 plays, 51 yards, 2:25.
- CIN – Tyler Boyd 10-yard pass from Joe Burrow (Evan McPherson kick), 1:51. Bengals 20–6. Drive: 12 plays, 82 yards, 6:04.
- LV – Zay Jones 14-yard pass from Derek Carr (Daniel Carlson kick), 0:13. Bengals 20–13. Drive: 11 plays, 80 yards, 1:38.

Third quarter

- CIN – Evan McPherson 43-yard field goal, 10:56. Bengals 23–13. Drive: 9 plays, 40 yards, 4:04.

Fourth quarter

- LV – Daniel Carlson 34-yard field goal, 14:17. Bengals 23–16. Drive: 13 plays, 57 yards, 7:30.
- CIN – Evan McPherson 38-yard field goal, 6:46. Bengals 26–16. Drive: 13 plays, 65 yards, 7:31.
- LV – Daniel Carlson 28-yard field goal, 3:34. Bengals 26–19. Drive: 12 plays, 67 yards, 3:12.

Top passers

- LV – Derek Carr – 29/54, 310 yards, TD, INT
- CIN – Joe Burrow – 24/34, 244 yards, 2 TD

Top rushers

- LV – Josh Jacobs – 13 rushes, 83 yards
- CIN – Joe Mixon – 17 rushes, 48 yards

Top receivers

- LV – Darren Waller – 7 receptions, 76 yards
- CIN – Ja'Marr Chase – 9 receptions, 116 yards

This game marked the first ever playoff start for both Bengals quarterback Joe Burrow, drafted in 2020, and Raiders quarterback Derek Carr, drafted in 2014. The Raiders had not won a playoff game since the AFC Championship in 2003, and the Bengals since a 1991 wild card game.

Thanks to a couple of third down conversions, the Raiders were able to drive deep into Bengals' territory on the opening possession of the game. Their advance was stopped by a Mike Hilton deflection on a pass intended for Hunter Renfrow on third and two, setting up a Daniel Carlson 47-yard field goal to make the score 3–0. On the ensuing possession, the Bengals drove down the field and scored on a touchdown pass to C. J. Uzomah to give the Bengals the 7–3 lead. On the next Raider drive, Carr was strip-sacked by Trey Hendrickson and the fumble recovered by Larry Ogunjobi. However, Burrow and the Bengals were not able to take advantage of the short field and settled for a 31-yard Evan McPherson field goal to extend the lead to 10-3. Due to an error on the kickoff, the Raiders were pinned deep at their own two to start the next possession and resulted in a punt. Early in the second quarter, the Bengals settled for a 30-yard McPherson field goal to extend their lead on the next possession to 10. The Raiders offense moved well into Bengal territory on two long runs by Josh Jacobs, but a DeSean Jackson drop on third and eight compelled the Raiders to again settle for a 28-yard field goal, narrowing the Bengals' lead to 13–6. On the next possession, Cincinnati drove to the Raiders' 31-yard line before converting a fourth and one opportunity to extend the drive. A few plays later, Burrow threw the ball towards the end zone a just before stepping out of bounds for another Begal touchdown. However, an official blew a whistle as the ball was airborne, but wide receiver Tyler Boyd caught the ball after the whistle. After discussion on the field, the officials ruled that the pass was a touchdown, extending the Bengals lead to 20–6 despite the whistle. The Raiders responded by driving into Cincinnati territory and Carr threw a touchdown pass to Zay Jones with 13 seconds left in the first half, narrowing the lead to seven. The Bengals took a knee to end the half.

The Bengals received the ball to begin the third quarter and extended their lead 43-yard field goal to 23–13. Following punts by both teams on their next possessions, Las Vegas moved into Bengal territory, eventually reaching the Cincinnati 36-yard line. A pass interference call on fourth down extended the drive, but the Raiders still settled for a 34-yard field goal by Carlson to move within seven at 23–16 as the fourth quarter began. Long completions to Ja'Marr Chase helped set up a Bengals drive deep into Raiders territory on the following possession that resulted in a 28-yard McPherson field goal to return Cincy's lead to 10 with 6:49 left in the game. On the following drive, a 13-yard completion to Darren Waller and a crucial fourth down conversion on a pass from Carr to Jackson put the Raiders deep into Bengal territory. However, the Cincinnati defense again forced the Raiders to settle for a 28-yard field goal to narrow the lead to 26–19. The Raiders' defense forced a three-and-out on the Bengals' subsequent possession which forced the Raiders to burn their last timeout. The Raiders' last possession began at their own 35-yard line. On the first play of the possession, Jacobs caught a pass for 15 yards and a roughing the passer penalty added 15 yards to the play. Moving deep into Bengal territory, Carr spiked the ball to stop the clock with 30 seconds remaining in the game with the ball at the 10. The following two passes fell incomplete and, on fourth and nine, Carr's pass to Jones was intercepted at the two-yard line by Germaine Pratt, sealing the win for the Bengals. Burrow took a knee to end the game, sending the Bengals to the divisional round of the playoffs, ending their 31-year long playoff win drought, and extending the Raiders' playoff win drought to 20 years.

The Raiders actually out-gained the Bengals 385 to 308, but the Bengals held the ball for three minutes more. Carr threw for 310 yards with an interception and a touchdown as the Raiders rushed for 103 yards in the game. The loss ended the Raiders' season with uncertainty ahead after a tumultuous season.

== Statistics ==
=== Team ===
| Category | Total yards | Yards per game | NFL rank (out of 32) |
|---|---|---|---|
| Passing offense | 4,567 | 268.6 | 6th |
| Rushing offense | 1,617 | 95.1 | 28th |
| Total offense | 6,184 | 363.8 | 11th |
| Passing defense | 3,789 | 222.9 | 13th |
| Rushing defense | 1,943 | 114.3 | 19th |
| Total defense | 5,732 | 337.2 | 14th |

=== Individual ===
| Category | Player | Total yards |
Offense
| Passing | Derek Carr | 4,804 |
| Rushing | Josh Jacobs | 872 |
| Receiving | Hunter Renfrow | 1,038 |
Defense
| Tackles (Solo) | Denzel Perryman | 102 |
| Sacks | Yannick Ngakoue | 10 |
| Interceptions | Johnathan Abram; Brandon Facyson; Casey Hayward | 1 |

Statistics correct as of the end of the 2021 NFL season

== See also ==
- List of organizational conflicts in the NFL
