= AJ Cole (American football) =

American football player (born 1995)

AJ Cole III
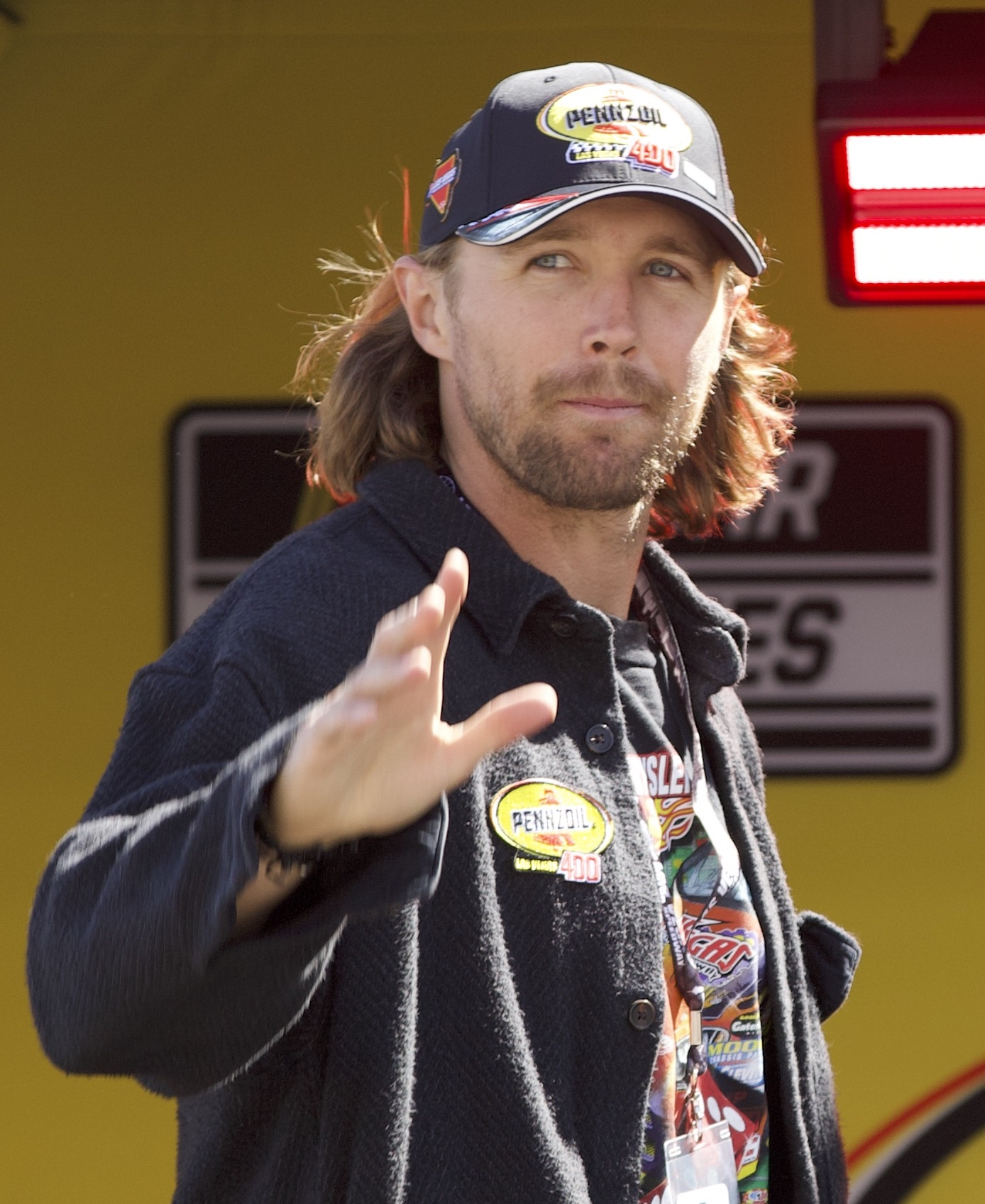
- Cole at Las Vegas Motor Speedway in 2024

No. 6 – Las Vegas Raiders
- Position: Punter
- Roster status: Active

Personal information
- Born: November 27, 1995 (age 30); Atlanta, Georgia, U.S.
- Listed height: 6 ft 4 in (1.93 m)
- Listed weight: 220 lb (100 kg)

Career information
- High school: Woodward Academy (College Park, Georgia)
- College: NC State (2014–2018)
- NFL draft: 2019: undrafted

Career history
- Oakland / Las Vegas Raiders (2019–present)

Awards and highlights
- 2× First-team All-Pro (2021, 2023); 3× Pro Bowl (2021–2023); NFL records: Most yards per punt in NFL history (minimum 250 career punts): 48.74

Career NFL statistics as of Week 10, 2026
- Punts: 479
- Punting yards: 23,345
- Punting average: 48.7
- Longest punt: 83
- Inside 20: 206
- Touchbacks: 38
- Stats at Pro Football Reference

Alfred James Cole III (born November 27, 1995) is an American professional football punter for the Las Vegas Raiders of the National Football League (NFL). He played college football for the NC State Wolfpack.

Cole has the most yards per punt (48.74) in NFL history. (Note: Minimum 250 career punts.)

== Early life ==
Cole grew up in College Park, Georgia and attended Woodward Academy, where he played football, basketball, and soccer. As a senior, Cole was named All-Metro Area by The Atlanta Journal-Constitution.

== College career ==
Cole was a four year starter at punter for the NC State Wolfpack. He finished his collegiate career with 9,288 punting yards (third-highest in school history) and averaged 42.2 yards per punt. He was a finalist for the Wuerffel Trophy as a junior and a semifinalist for the award as a senior. In 2017, Cole was awarded Honorable Mention All-American honors by GPR Analytics.

== Professional career ==
Pre-draft measurables
| Height | Weight | Arm length | Hand span | Wingspan |
|---|---|---|---|---|
| 6 ft 4 1/8 in (1.93 m) | 217 lb (98 kg) | 33 3/8 in (0.85 m) | 8 3/4 in (0.22 m) | 6 ft 7 1/2 in (2.02 m) |
All values from Pro Day

=== Oakland/Las Vegas Raiders ===
==== 2019 season ====
Cole was signed as an undrafted free agent by the Oakland Raiders on May 6, 2019, after participating in a rookie mini camp with the team. He beat out incumbent punter Johnny Townsend in training camp to make the Raiders' 53-man roster.

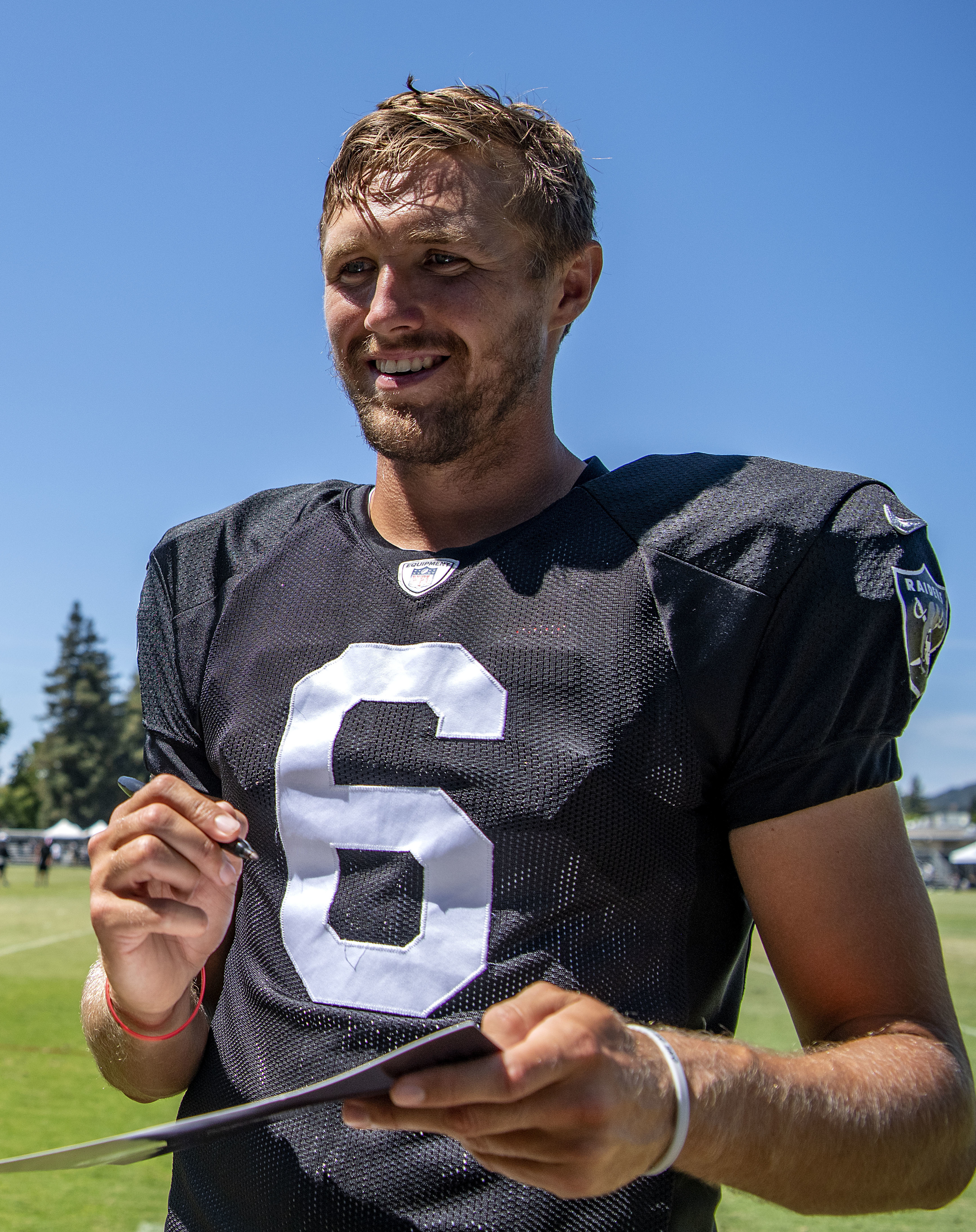
Cole in 2019

Cole made his NFL debut on September 9, 2019, against the Denver Broncos, punting three times for 134 yards (44.7 average). Cole finished his rookie season with 67 punts for 3,081 yards (46.0 yards per punt).

==== 2020 season ====
In the 2020 season, Cole punted 44 times for an average of 44.1 yards.

==== 2021 season ====
On December 9, 2021, Cole signed a four-year, $12.4 million contract extension with the Raiders. On December 20, 2021, Cole was named to the 2022 Pro Bowl. Cole led the league among qualified punters in yards per punt in 2021, averaging 50.03 yards per punt. Cole received first-team All-Pro distinction in 2021.

==== 2022 season ====
At the start of the season, Cole was named, for the first time in his career, one of the team captains. On the 2022 season, Cole had 59 punts for 2,884 net yards for a 48.88 average. On January 30, 2023, Cole was named to his second Pro Bowl, replacing Tommy Townsend.

==== 2023 season ====
In Week 9 of the 2023 season against the New York Giants in a 30–6 Raiders' victory, Cole punted five times and totaled 318 yards on those punts, setting a then-NFL record for gross punt average in a game, with 63.6 yards. His record held until it was broken by Cincinnati Bengals rookie punter Ryan Rehkow, who averaged 64.5 yards on four punts, in Week 1 of the 2024 season. Cole finished the 2023 season with 75 punts for 3,783 yards for a 50.4 yard average.

==== 2024 season ====
In Week 12 of the 2024 season against the Denver Broncos, Cole threw a 34-yard reception to Divine Deablo in a fake punt. Cole was the first Raiders punter to complete a pass since 2012 (Shane Lechler), and the 34-yard completion was the longest by a punter in the NFL since 2017 (Pat O'Donnell completed a 38-yard pass to Benny Cunningham for the Chicago Bears.)

==== 2025 season ====
On May 26, 2025, Cole signed a four-year, $15.8 million contract extension with the Raiders, making him the NFL's highest-paid punter. On October 5, 2025, Cole got his punt blocked by Segun Olubi.

== NFL career statistics ==
Legend
| | NFL record |
| | Led the league |
| **Bold** | Career high |

=== Regular season ===
| Year | Team | GP | Punting | | | | | | | |
| Year | Team | GP | Punts | Yds | Lng | Avg | Net Avg | Blk | Ins20 | RetY |
|---|---|---|---|---|---|---|---|---|---|---|
| 2019 | OAK | 16 | 67 | 3,081 | 74 | 46.0 | 39.4 | 0 | 33 | 318 |
| 2020 | LV | 16 | 44 | 1,939 | 63 | 44.1 | 40.1 | 0 | 20 | 133 |
| 2021 | LV | **17** | 64 | 3,202 | 71 | 50.0 | 42.4 | 0 | 28 | 347 |
| 2022 | LV | **17** | 59 | 2,884 | 67 | 48.9 | 43.9 | 0 | 26 | 274 |
| 2023 | LV | **17** | **75** | **3,783** | **83** | 50.4 | **45.0** | 0 | **34** | 287 |
| 2024 | LV | **17** | 65 | 3,304 | 71 | **50.8** | 42.5 | **2** | 27 | 294 |
| 2025 | LV | **17** | 71 | 3,379 | 64 | 47.6 | 40.3 | **2** | 24 | **349** |
| 2026 | LV | 10 | 34 | 1,773 | 72 | 52.1 | 44.6 | 0 | 14 | 173 |
| Career | | 127 | 479 | 23,345 | 83 | 48.7 | 42.0 | 4 | 206 | 2,175 |

=== Postseason ===
| Year | Team | GP | Punting | | | | | | | |
| Year | Team | GP | Punts | Yds | Lng | Avg | Net Avg | Blk | Ins20 | RetY |
|---|---|---|---|---|---|---|---|---|---|---|
| 2021 | LV | 1 | 2 | 99 | 58 | 49.5 | 36.5 | 0 | 0 | 26 |
| Career | | 1 | 2 | 99 | 58 | 49.5 | 36.5 | 0 | 0 | 26 |
