= Bryan Edwards (American football) =

American football player (born 1998)

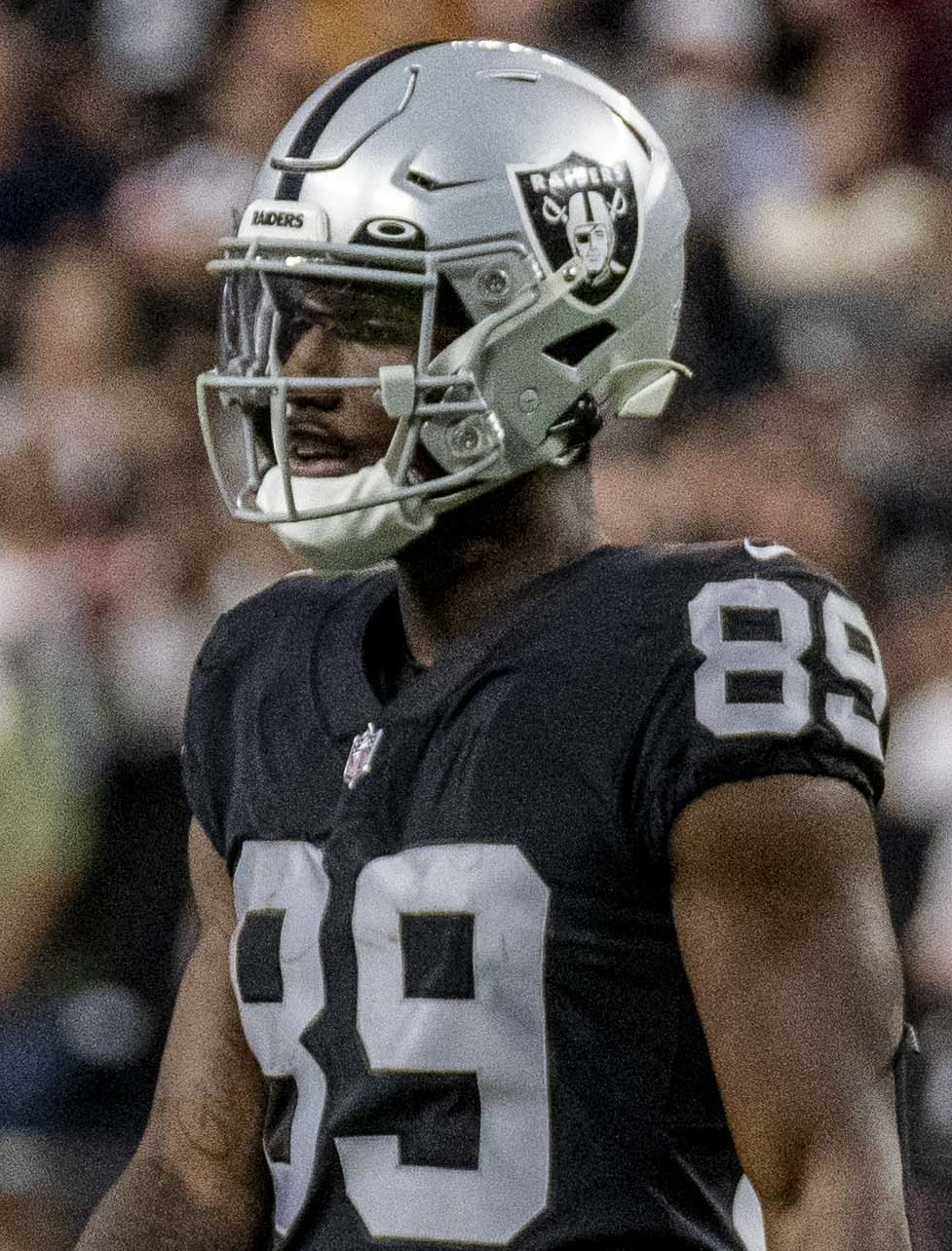
- Edwards with the Las Vegas Raiders in 2021

No. 89
- Position: Wide receiver

Personal information
- Born: November 13, 1998 (age 27); Conway, South Carolina, U.S.
- Listed height: 6 ft 3 in (1.91 m)
- Listed weight: 215 lb (98 kg)

Career information
- High school: Conway
- College: South Carolina (2016–2019)
- NFL draft: 2020: 3rd round, 81st overall pick

Career history
- Las Vegas Raiders (2020–2021); Atlanta Falcons (2022); Kansas City Chiefs (2022)*; New Orleans Saints (2023)*
- * Offseason or practice squad member only

Awards and highlights
- Second-team All-SEC (2019)

Career NFL statistics
- Receptions: 48
- Receiving yards: 779
- Receiving touchdowns: 4
- Stats at Pro Football Reference

Bryan J. Edwards (born November 13, 1998) is an American former professional football player who was a wide receiver in the National Football League (NFL). He played college football for the South Carolina Gamecocks and was selected by the Las Vegas Raiders in the third round of the 2020 NFL draft.

== Early life ==
Edwards attended Conway High School in Conway, South Carolina. During his career, he had 188 receptions for 2,562 yards and 32 touchdowns. He was selected to play in the 2016 U.S. Army All-American Game, but did not play due to injury. He committed to the University of South Carolina to play college football.

== College career ==
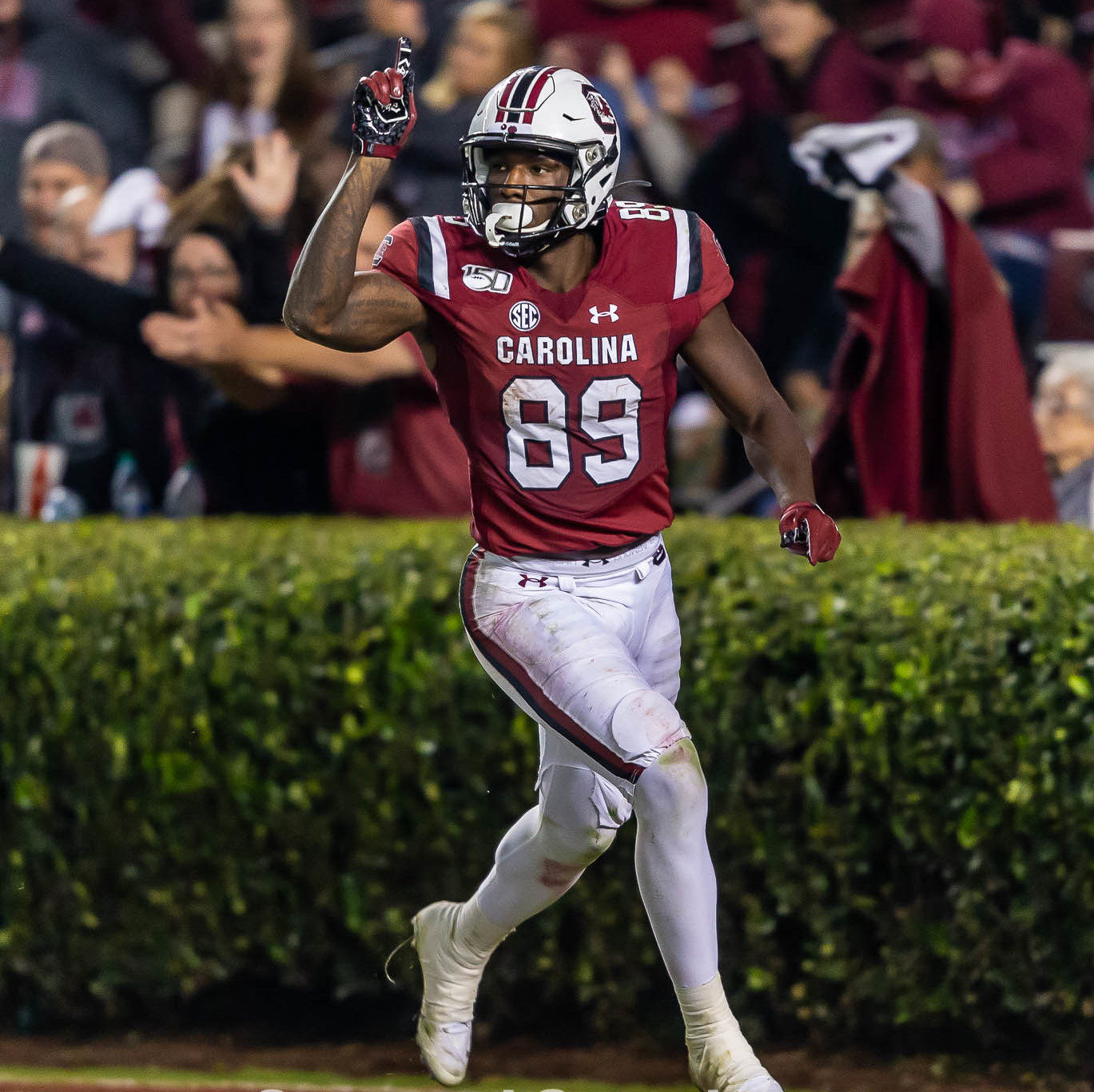
Edwards with South Carolina in 2019.

Edwards started all 12 games he played in his freshman year at South Carolina in 2016. He had 44 receptions for 590 yards and four touchdowns. As a true freshman, Edwards earned Athlon's Freshman All-America second-team honors and All-Southeastern Conference Freshman first-team accolades. As a sophomore in 2017, he started all 13 games and led the team with 64 receptions for 793 yards and five touchdowns. As a junior in 2018, he had 55 receptions for 846 yards and seven touchdowns. During his senior year in 2019, he passed Kenny McKinley's school record for career receptions and Alshon Jeffery's school record career receiving yards. He played in the first 10 games of the season before suffering a season-ending injury. He finished the season with 71 receptions for 816 yards and six touchdowns. For his career, he had 234 receptions, 3,045 receiving yards and 22 touchdowns.

South Carolina football receiving records:

- 1st place all-time receptions: 234 receptions
- 1st place all-time receiving yards: 3,045 yards
- 2nd place all-time receiving touchdowns: 22 receiving touchdowns
- 1st place all-time consecutive games with a reception: 48 consecutive games with a catch

== Professional career ==
Pre-draft measurables
Height	Weight	Arm length	Hand span	Wingspan	Wonderlic
6 ft 2 3/4 in (1.90 m)	212 lb (96 kg)	32 1/4 in (0.82 m)	9 1/2 in (0.24 m)	6 ft 6 5/8 in (2.00 m)	28
All values from NFL Combine

=== Las Vegas Raiders ===
Edwards was selected by the Las Vegas Raiders in the third round with the 81st overall pick of the 2020 NFL draft. The Raiders obtained this pick along with two first round picks as part of the trade that sent defensive end Khalil Mack to the Chicago Bears.

Edwards entered his first training camp competing for a starting job against Tyrell Williams, Nelson Agholor, Hunter Renfrow, Zay Jones, and fellow rookie Henry Ruggs III. At the end of the Raiders’ training camp, head coach Jon Gruden named Edwards and Ruggs as the starting wide receivers for the 2020 NFL season.

Edwards made his first career start and NFL debut in the Raiders’ season-opening win against the Carolina Panthers, notching 1 reception for 9 yards on one target. The following week against the New Orleans Saints, Edwards recorded 2 receptions for 42 yards on two targets in the 34–24 win. In the Raiders’ Week 3 contest against the New England Patriots, Edwards recorded 2 receptions for 48 yards on 3 targets before leaving the game with an ankle injury. He missed Weeks 4 to 8 recovering from the injury. After returning from the injury in Week 9, Edwards lost his starting job to Nelson Agholor and took on a depth role for the remainder of the season. In the Raiders’ season finale against the Denver Broncos, Edwards recorded 2 receptions for 51 yards and his first career touchdown catch during the 32–31 win. Edwards finished his rookie season appearing in 12 games (3 starts) and recording 11 receptions for 193 yards and a touchdown.

=== Atlanta Falcons ===
On May 13, 2022, the Raiders traded Edwards along with a 2023 seventh-round pick to the Atlanta Falcons for a 2023 fifth-round selection. On November 24, Edwards was released by the Falcons.

=== Kansas City Chiefs ===
On November 28, 2022, the Kansas City Chiefs signed Edwards to their practice squad. He was released by the Chiefs on January 4, 2023.

=== New Orleans Saints ===
On March 27, 2023, Edwards signed with the New Orleans Saints. He was waived by New Orleans on August 22.

== NFL career statistics ==
Year	Team	Games		Receiving					Rushing					Fumbles	
Year	Team	GP	GS	Rec	Yds	Avg	Lng	TD	Att	Yds	Avg	Lng	TD	Fum	Lost
2020	LV	12	3	11	193	17.5	34	1	0	0	0.0	0	0	0	0
2021	LV	16	12	34	571	16.8	51	3	1	0	0.0	0	0	1	0
2022	ATL	7	1	3	15	5.0	10	0	0	0	0.0	0	0	0	0
Career		35	16	48	779	16.2	51	4	1	0	0.0	0	0	1	0
