= Divine Deablo =

American football player (born 1998)

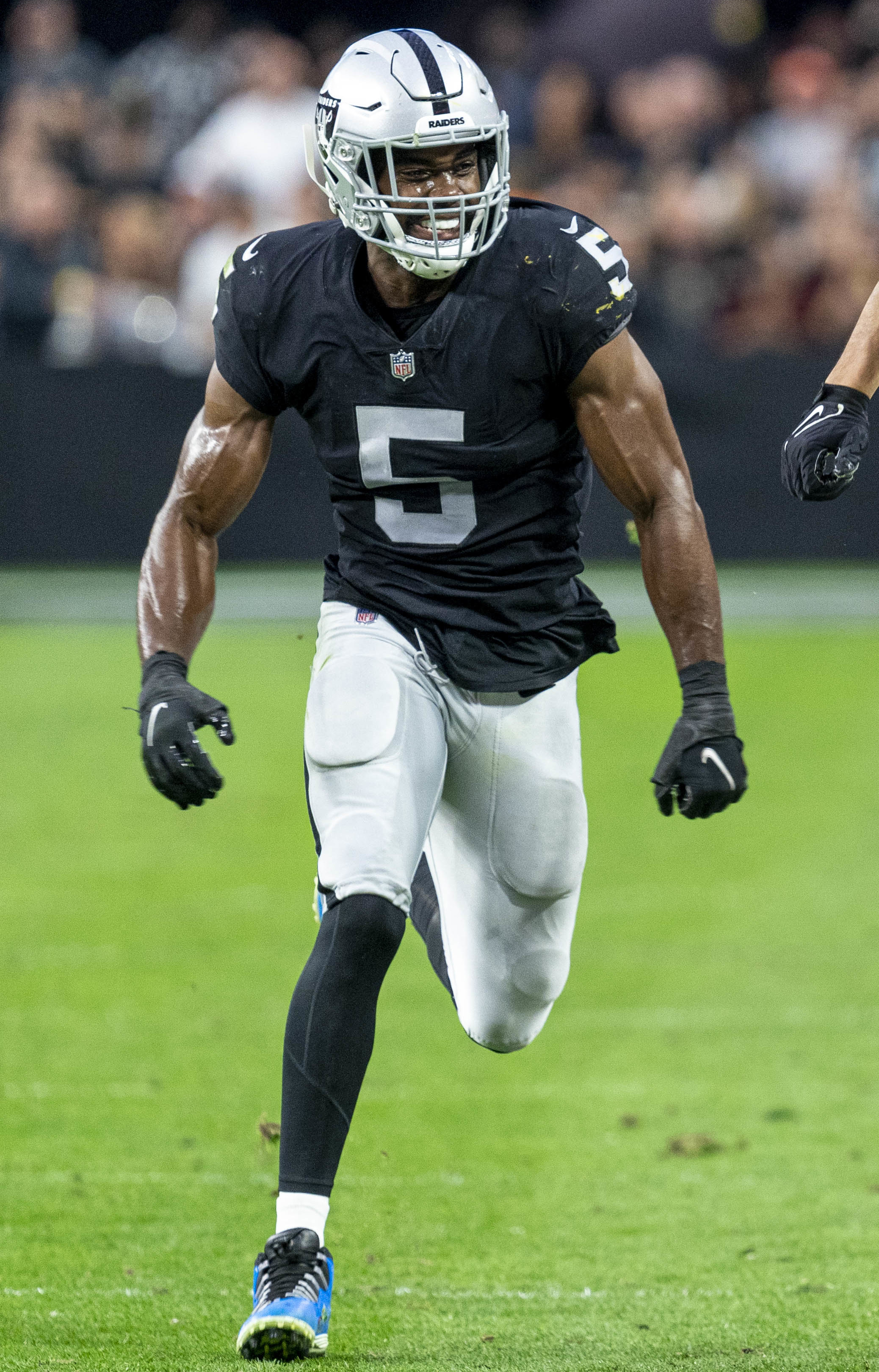
- Deablo with the Las Vegas Raiders in 2021

No. 0 – Atlanta Falcons
- Position: Linebacker
- Roster status: Active

Personal information
- Born: August 17, 1998 (age 28); Winston-Salem, North Carolina, U.S.
- Listed height: 6 ft 3 in (1.91 m)
- Listed weight: 223 lb (101 kg)

Career information
- High school: Mount Tabor (Winston-Salem)
- College: Virginia Tech (2016–2020)
- NFL draft: 2021: 3rd round, 80th overall pick

Career history
- Las Vegas Raiders (2021–2024); Atlanta Falcons (2025–present)

Awards and highlights
- First-team All-ACC (2020)

Career NFL statistics as of Week 5, 2026
- Total tackles: 387
- Sacks: 3
- Forced fumbles: 0
- Fumble recoveries: 4
- Pass deflections: 14
- Interceptions: 0
- Defensive touchdowns: 0
- Stats at Pro Football Reference

Divine Ahmad Deablo (born August 17, 1998) is an American professional football linebacker for the Atlanta Falcons of the National Football League (NFL). Originally a wide receiver, he converted to safety at Virginia Tech, where he earned first-team All-ACC honors in 2020. The Las Vegas Raiders selected him in the third round of the 2021 NFL draft, and he transitioned to linebacker after entering the NFL. After four seasons with Las Vegas, he signed with Atlanta in 2025.

== Early life ==
Deablo grew up in Winston-Salem, North Carolina, and attended Mount Tabor High School. He was named All-Central Piedmont Conference at wide receiver in each of his final three seasons as well as All-Northwest North Carolina in his senior season after averaging 21 yards per reception with 10 touchdown receptions. As a senior, Deablo committed to play college football at Virginia Tech over offers from North Carolina and N.C. State.

== College career ==
Deablo played for the Virginia Tech Hokies from 2016 to 2020. As a true freshman in 2016, he appeared in all 14 games, playing primarily on special teams and catching one pass for eight yards. Before the 2017 season, he moved from wide receiver to safety. He played in four games before suffering a season-ending foot injury and was granted a medical redshirt.

In 2018, Deablo started 11 games at safety and recorded 55 tackles, two passes defended, and one fumble recovery. He started all 13 games in 2019 and finished second on the team with a career-high 84 tackles. Against Notre Dame, he returned a fumble 98 yards for a touchdown and was named Atlantic Coast Conference (ACC) Defensive Back of the Week.

In 2020, Deablo recorded 55 tackles and four interceptions, tying for the ACC lead, and was named first-team All-ACC. He finished his Virginia Tech career with 206 tackles and six interceptions in 51 games, including 39 starts.

== Professional career ==
Pre-draft measurables
Height	Weight	Arm length	Hand span	Wingspan	40-yard dash	10-yard split	20-yard split	20-yard shuttle	Three-cone drill	Vertical jump	Broad jump	Bench press
6 ft 3 1/4 in (1.91 m)	226 lb (103 kg)	33 in (0.84 m)	9 in (0.23 m)	6 ft 5 7/8 in (1.98 m)	4.45 s	1.63 s	2.68 s	4.45 s	7.01 s	34.0 in (0.86 m)	10 ft 6 in (3.20 m)	19 reps
All values from Pro Day

=== Las Vegas Raiders ===
Deablo was selected by the Las Vegas Raiders in the third round (80th overall) of the 2021 NFL draft. Although he had played safety at Virginia Tech, he transitioned to linebacker in the NFL. He signed his four-year rookie contract with Las Vegas on July 23, 2021. As a rookie, he appeared in all 17 games, made five starts, and recorded 45 tackles.

Deablo entered the 2022 season as a starting linebacker. He started the first eight games and led the team with 74 tackles before being placed on injured reserve on November 7.

In 2023, Deablo started 15 games and recorded a career-high 106 tackles, four tackles for loss, two passes defended, and his first career sack. He started 14 games in 2024, finishing with 63 tackles, four tackles for loss, one sack, and two passes defended. Against the Denver Broncos in Week 12, he also caught a 34-yard pass from punter AJ Cole on a fake punt, the first reception of his career.

=== Atlanta Falcons ===
On March 14, 2025, Deablo signed a two-year, $14 million contract with the Atlanta Falcons. In his first season with Atlanta, he started 13 games and recorded 73 tackles, five tackles for loss, one sack, seven passes defended, and one fumble recovery.

Deablo fractured his left forearm during the Falcons' Week 7 loss to the San Francisco 49ers and was placed on injured reserve on October 25. After missing four games, he was designated to return on November 19 and activated to the 53-man roster on November 22. He returned to action against the New Orleans Saints the following day.

During the 2026 offseason, following Kaden Elliss's departure in free agency, Deablo was assigned the Falcons' defensive communication "green dot", giving him responsibility for relaying calls to the defense.

== NFL career statistics ==
Legend
**Bold**	Career high

=== Regular season ===
Year	Team	Games		Tackles					Interceptions						Fumbles				
Year	Team	GP	GS	Cmb	Solo	Ast	Sck	TFL	Int	Yds	Avg	Lng	TD	PD	FF	Fum	FR	Yds	TD
2021	LV	17	5	45	28	17	0.0	1	0	0	0.0	0	0	1	0	0	**1**	0	0
2022	LV	8	8	74	38	36	0.0	1	0	0	0.0	0	0	1	0	0	0	0	0
2023	LV	15	15	**106**	**65**	**41**	**1.0**	4	0	0	0.0	0	0	2	0	0	**1**	0	0
2024	LV	14	14	63	35	28	**1.0**	4	0	0	0.0	0	0	2	0	0	0	0	0
2025	ATL	13	13	73	38	35	**1.0**	**5**	0	0	0.0	0	0	**7**	0	0	**1**	0	0
2026	ATL	5	5	26	13	13	0.0	1	0	0	0.0	0	0	1	0	0	1	0	0
Career		72	60	387	217	170	3.0	16	0	0	0.0	0	0	14	0	0	4	0	0

=== Postseason ===
Year	Team	Games		Tackles					Interceptions						Fumbles				
Year	Team	GP	GS	Cmb	Solo	Ast	Sck	TFL	Int	Yds	Avg	Lng	TD	PD	FF	Fum	FR	Yds	TD
2021	LV	1	1	8	3	5	0.0	0	0	0	0.0	0	0	0	0	0	0	0	0
Career		1	1	8	3	5	0.0	0	0	0	0.0	0	0	0	0	0	0	0	0
