= Brandon Facyson =

American football player (born 1994)

No. 31, 35, 36
- Position: Cornerback

Personal information
- Born: September 8, 1994 (age 32); Jacksonville, Florida, U.S.
- Listed height: 6 ft 2 in (1.88 m)
- Listed weight: 197 lb (89 kg)

Career information
- High school: Northgate (Newnan, Georgia)
- College: Virginia Tech
- NFL draft: 2018: undrafted

Career history
- Los Angeles Chargers (2018–2021); Las Vegas Raiders (2021); Indianapolis Colts (2022); Las Vegas Raiders (2023)

Career NFL statistics
- Total tackles: 148
- Forced fumbles: 1
- Fumble recoveries: 2
- Pass deflections: 20
- Interceptions: 1
- Stats at Pro Football Reference

Brandon Lamar Facyson (/ˈfeɪsɛn/ FAY-sen; born September 8, 1994) is an American former professional football cornerback. He played college football at Virginia Tech.

== Professional career ==
Pre-draft measurables
Height	Weight	Arm length	Hand span	Wingspan	40-yard dash	10-yard split	20-yard split	20-yard shuttle	Three-cone drill	Vertical jump	Broad jump	Bench press
6 ft 1 1/2 in (1.87 m)	203 lb (92 kg)	32 5/8 in (0.83 m)	9 3/4 in (0.25 m)	6 ft 6 1/2 in (1.99 m)	4.53 s	1.57 s	2.64 s	4.35 s	7.00 s	36.0 in (0.91 m)	9 ft 10 in (3.00 m)	16 reps
All values from NFL Combine/Pro Day

=== Los Angeles Chargers ===
Facyson signed with the Los Angeles Chargers as an undrafted free agent in 2018. Facyson finished his rookie season with 3 tackles, playing in 15 games as well as both playoff games for the Chargers. In Facyson's second season he made his first professional start in a Week 2 loss to the Lions. Facyson finished his second season starting 4 games, playing in all 16, and recording 41 tackles.

Facyson was placed on the reserve/COVID-19 list by the team on November 7, 2020, and activated on November 25.

Facyson re-signed with the Chargers on March 19, 2021. He was waived on September 1, 2021, and re-signed to the practice squad the next day.

=== Las Vegas Raiders (first stint) ===
On October 6, 2021, Facyson was signed by the Las Vegas Raiders off the Chargers practice squad. In Week 6 against the Denver Broncos, Facyson recorded his first career interception off a pass thrown by Teddy Bridgewater during the 34–24 victory.

=== Indianapolis Colts ===
On March 18, 2022, Facyson signed with the Indianapolis Colts.

=== Las Vegas Raiders (second stint) ===
On March 16, 2023, Facyson signed a one-year contract with the Raiders. He was placed on injured reserve on September 8, 2023. He was activated on December 24.

On August 28, 2024, Facyson was placed on injured reserve, and released a few days later.
