= Amik Robertson =

American football player (born 1998)

No. 2 – Washington Commanders
- Position: Cornerback
- Roster status: Active

Personal information
- Born: July 6, 1998 (age 28); Thibodaux, Louisiana, U.S.
- Listed height: 5 ft 8 in (1.73 m)
- Listed weight: 187 lb (85 kg)

Career information
- High school: Thibodaux
- College: Louisiana Tech (2017–2019)
- NFL draft: 2020: 4th round, 139th overall pick

Career history
- Las Vegas Raiders (2020–2023); Detroit Lions (2024–2025); Washington Commanders (2026–present)

Awards and highlights
- First-team All-American (2019); 2× First-team All-C-USA (2018, 2019)

Career NFL statistics as of 2025
- Tackles: 213
- Sacks: 2
- Forced fumbles: 7
- Fumble recoveries: 1
- Pass deflections: 35
- Interceptions: 5
- Touchdowns: 1
- Stats at Pro Football Reference

Amik Robertson (born July 6, 1998) is an American professional football cornerback for the Washington Commanders of the National Football League (NFL). Robertson played college football for the Louisiana Tech Bulldogs and was selected by the Las Vegas Raiders in the fourth round of the 2020 NFL draft. He has also played for the Detroit Lions.

== Early life ==
Robertson attended Thibodaux High School in Thibodaux, Louisiana. A 3-star recruit, Robertson committed to Louisiana Tech to play football over offers from Houston, Kansas State, and LSU, among others.

== College career ==
Robertson played at Louisiana Tech University from 2017 to 2019. He became a starter his freshman year and remained there throughout his college career. As a freshman he was the Defensive MVP of the 2017 Frisco Bowl. As a junior he was named a first-team All-American by the Football Writers Association of America (FWAA). He finished his career with 184 tackles, 14 interceptions, four sacks and three touchdowns. After his junior season, he entered the 2020 NFL draft, forgoing his senior season.

== Professional career ==
=== Las Vegas Raiders ===
==== 2020 ====
He attended the NFL Scouting Combine, but chose not to participate in any physical drills. NFL draft scouts and analysts correlated the lack of interest and attention Robertson received to his lack of size although he produced well throughout his collegiate career. Scouts Inc. had Robertson listed as the ninth best cornerback (68th overall) on their big board. NFL.com media analyst Daniel Jeremiah listed Robertson as the 11th best cornerback prospect (85th overall) in the draft. Kevin Hanson of Sports Illustrated ranked him as the 14th best cornerback prospect in the draft. The majority of NFL draft analysts projected he could be selected as early as the third round, or as late as the fifth round in the 2020 NFL draft. NFL analyst Lance Zierlein projected Robertson would be selected in the fourth or fifth round.

Pre-draft measurables
Height	Weight	Arm length	Hand span	Wingspan
5 ft 8 3/8 in (1.74 m)	187 lb (85 kg)	30 1/4 in (0.77 m)	9 in (0.23 m)	6 ft 1 7/8 in (1.88 m)
All values from NFL Combine

The Las Vegas Raiders selected Robertson in the fourth round (139th overall) of the 2020 NFL draft. He was the 16th cornerback drafted and the second of two cornerbacks selected by the Raiders in 2020, following first-round pick (19th overall) Damon Arnette.

External videos
- Raiders select Amik Robertson No. 139
- Amik Robertson: College Highlights

On July 25, 2020, the Las Vegas Raiders signed Robertson to a four–year, $3.78 million rookie contract that included an initial signing bonus of $494,400.

He entered training camp as a candidate to earn a starting role at cornerback, but had to compete among a group that included Damon Arnette, Trayvon Mullen, Prince Amukamara, Lamarcus Joyner, and Isaiah Johnson. Head coach Jon Gruden named him a backup cornerback to begin the season, behind Trayvon Mullen, Lamarcus Joyner, Damon Arnette, Isaiah Johnson, and Keisean Nixon. He was able to earn the last roster spot as the sixth cornerback after Nevin Lawson was suspended.

He was inactive as a healthy scratch for the first three games (Weeks 1–3) of the 2020 NFL season. On October 4, 2020, Robertson made his professional regular season debut and recorded two combined tackles (one solo) as the Raiders lost 23–30 to the Buffalo Bills. On December 13, 2020, the Las Vegas Raiders fired defensive coordinator Paul Guenther following a 44–27 loss against the Indianapolis Colts in Week 14. Former Dallas Cowboys' defensive line coach Rod Marinelli was appointed interim defensive coordinator. He finished his rookie season with only four combined tackles (three solo) in eight games without earning a start.

==== 2021 ====
On January 12, 2021, the Las Vegas Raiders announced their decision to hire Gus Bradley to be their defensive coordinator. During training camp, he competed for the role as the starting nickelback against Nate Hobbs, Rasul Douglas, and Nevin Lawson following the departure of Lamarcus Joyner. Head coach Jon Gruden named Robertson a backup and listed him as the fifth cornerback on the depth chart to begin the regular season, behind Trayvon Mullen, Casey Hayward, Damon Arnette, and Nate Hobbs.

In Week 4, Robertson set a season-high with seven combined tackles (six solo) during a 14–21 loss at the Los Angeles Chargers. On October 10, 2021, Robertson earned his first career start after Damon Arnette and Trayvon Mullen suffered injuries rendering them inactive. He recorded seven combined tackles (five solo) as the Raiders lost 9–30 against the Chicago Bears. The following day, head coach Jon Gruden announced his resignation amid multiple controversies. Special teams coordinator Rich Bisaccia was appointed to interim head coach. He finished the 2021 NFL season with only 19 combined tackles (14 solo) in ten games and two starts.

==== 2022 ====
On January 31, 2022, the Las Vegas Raiders hired Josh McDaniels to be their head coach. Throughout training camp, he competed against Trayvon Mullen, Nate Hobbs, and Rock Ya-Sin for a role as a starting cornerback under new defensive coordinator Patrick Graham. Head coach Josh McDaniels named him a backup and listed him as the fourth cornerback on the depth chart to begin the season, behind Nate Hobbs, Rock Ya-Sin, and Anthony Averett.

On September 18, 2022, Robertson earned his first start of the season as a nickelback and made four solo tackles, one pass deflection, and had his first career interception on a pass attempt thrown by Kyler Murray to wide receiver Marquise Brown during a 29–23 loss against the Arizona Cardinals. On October 2, 2022, Robertson recorded three combined tackles (two solo) and returned a fumble recovery that was forced by Duron Harmon by running back Melvin Gordon for 68–yards to score his first career touchdown during a 32–23 victory against the Denver Broncos. In Week 10, he set a season-high with six combined tackles (three solo), made one pass deflection, and recovered a fumble as the Raiders lost 20–25 against the Indianapolis Colts. In Week 14, he recorded three solo tackles and had his first career sack on Baker Mayfield for a one–yard loss during a 16–17 loss at the Los Angeles Rams. The following week, Robertson recorded one solo tackle and set a season-high with three pass deflections as the Raiders defeated the New England Patriots 30–24 in Week 15. On January 1, 2023, Robertson recorded two solo tackles, made one pass deflection, and set a career-high with his second interception of the season on a pass by Brock Purdy to tight end George Kittle during a 34–37 overtime loss to the San Francisco 49ers. He finished the season with 38 combined tackles (29 solo), nine pass deflections, two interceptions, two sacks, one forced fumble, a fumble recovery, and a touchdown, while appearing in all 17 games with seven starts.

==== 2023 ====
He entered training camp as a possible candidate to earn a role as a starting cornerback, but had to compete against Nate Hobbs, Brandon Facyson, David Long, Duke Shelley, Jakorian Bennett, and Tyler Hall He also competed to earn the role as the primary backup nickelback against Tyler Hall. Head coach Josh McDaniels named him a backup and listed him as the fourth cornerback on the depth chart to begin the season, behind Marcus Peters, Nate Hobbs, and Jakorion Bennett.

He was promoted to the No. 2 starting cornerback after Nate Hobbs injured his ankle and was rendered inactive for four consecutive games. In Week 5, Robertson made two combined tackles (one solo), a pass deflection, and sealed the Raiders' 17–13 victory against the Green Bay Packers by intercepting a pass thrown by Jordan Love to wide receiver Christian Watson with 51 seconds left in the game. On October 31, 2023, the Las Vegas Raiders fired head coach Josh McDaniels after they began the season with a 3–5 record. They appointed linebackers coach Antonio Pierce to interim head coach for the remainder of the season. In Week 9, Robertson recorded three solo tackles, set a season-high with two pass deflections, and intercepted a pass by Tommy DeVito to wide receiver Jalin Hyatt as the Raiders defeated the New York Giants 6–30. Interim head coach Antonio Pierce demoted Robertson for two games (Weeks 11–12) and replaced him with Marcus Peters until benching Peters during their 17–31 loss to the Kansas City Chiefs in Week 12. He re-gained his role as a starting cornerback and remained a starter for the last five games (Weeks 14–18) of the season. On November 27, 2023, the Raiders waived Marcus Peters. He finished the 2023 NFL season with a total of 50 combined tackles (38 solo), six pass deflections, two interceptions, and one sack in 17 games and 11 starts. He received an overall grade of 63.4 from Pro Football Focus in 2023.

=== Detroit Lions ===
On March 14, 2024, the Detroit Lions signed Robertson to a two–year, $9.25 million contract that includes $4.50 million guaranteed upon signing and an initial signing bonus of $3.30 million. He joined a new group of cornerbacks that the Lions had recently acquired following the departure of all of their former starting cornerbacks, including Cameron Sutton, Jerry Jacobs, and Will Harris.

Under defensive coordinator Aaron Glenn, he competed to earn a role as a primary cornerback, against Emmanuel Moseley and 2024 first-round pick (24th overall) Terrion Arnold. Head coach Dan Campbell named him the starting nickelback and listed him as the third cornerback on the depth chart to begin the season, behind starters Carlton Davis and Terrion Arnold.

On September 30, 2024, Robertson set a season-high with eight solo tackles and made two pass deflections as the Lions defeated the Seattle Seahawks 42–29. In Week 15, No. 1 starting cornerback Carlton Davis suffered a fractured jaw and was placed on injured reserve for the remainder of the season. Robertson was subsequently promoted to being a starting cornerback for the last three games (Weeks 16–18) of the season. In Week 16, he earned his first start as an starting outside cornerback with the Lions and recorded eight combined tackles (five solo) and tied his season-high of two pass deflections during a 34–17 victory at the Chicago Bears. He finished the season with a total of 50 combined tackles (40 solo), made eight pass deflections, and led the team with three forced fumbles, while appearing in all 17 games with four starts. He received an overall grade of 64.5 from Pro Football Focus, which ranked 87th amongst 222 qualifying cornerbacks in 2024.

The Detroit Lions finished the 2024 NFL season a top the NFC North with a 15–2 record and earned a first-round bye. On January 18, 2025, Robertson started in his first career postseason appearance and was limited to one solo tackle and only two snaps on defense, before exiting the game in the beginning of the first quarter after suffering a broken arm as the Lions lost 31–45 against the Washington Commanders in the NFC Divisional Round. He would undergo surgery for his broken arm.

=== Washington Commanders ===
Robertson signed a two-year, $16 million contract with the Washington Commanders on March 12, 2026.

== NFL career statistics ==
Legend
	Led the league
**Bold**	Career high

=== Regular season ===
Year	Team	Games		Tackles					Interceptions						Fumbles			
Year	Team	GP	GS	Cmb	Solo	Ast	Sck	TFL	Int	Yds	Avg	Lng	TD	PD	FF	FR	Yds	TD
2020	LV	8	0	4	3	1	0.0	0	0	0	0.0	0	0	0	0	0	0	0
2021	LV	10	2	19	14	5	0.0	0	0	0	0.0	0	0	0	0	0	0	0
2022	LV	17	7	38	29	9	**1.0**	2	**2**	7	3.5	7	0	9	1	**1**	**68**	**1**
2023	LV	17	12	50	38	**12**	**1.0**	2	**2**	**40**	**20.0**	**40**	0	6	1	0	0	0
2024	DET	17	4	50	40	10	0.0	**4**	0	0	0.0	0	0	8	**3**	0	0	0
2025	DET	17	10	**52**	**43**	9	0.0	2	1	2	2.0	2	0	**12**	2	0	0	0
Career		86	35	213	167	46	2.0	10	5	49	9.8	40	0	35	7	1	68	1

=== Postseason ===
Year	Team	Games		Tackles					Interceptions						Fumbles			
Year	Team	GP	GS	Cmb	Solo	Ast	Sck	TFL	Int	Yds	Avg	Lng	TD	PD	FF	FR	Yds	TD
2024	DET	1	1	1	1	0	0.0	0	0	0	0.0	0	0	0	0	0	0	0
Career		1	1	1	1	0	0.0	0	0	0	0.0	0	0	0	0	0	0	0

== Personal life ==
Robertson credits the adversity he faced in his early life and his faith as motivations for his success. His mother Kima was 15 when he was born. His father, Arthur Watts was incarcerated for the first five years of Robertson's life, re-entering his son's life when Robertson was 11. Robertson became a father at age 15 when his son Aiden Miguel was born on August 18, 2014.
