= 2022 Las Vegas Raiders season =

63rd season in franchise history

- Owner: Mark Davis
- General manager: Dave Ziegler
- President: Sandra Douglass Morgan
- Head coach: Josh McDaniels
- Home stadium: Allegiant Stadium

Results
- Record: 6–11
- Division place: 3rd AFC West
- Playoffs: Did not qualify
- All-Pros: WR Davante Adams (1st team); PK Daniel Carlson (1st team); RB Josh Jacobs (1st team)
- Pro Bowlers: WR Davante Adams; QB Derek Carr (alternate); P A. J. Cole III (alternate); DE Maxx Crosby; RB Josh Jacobs

Uniform
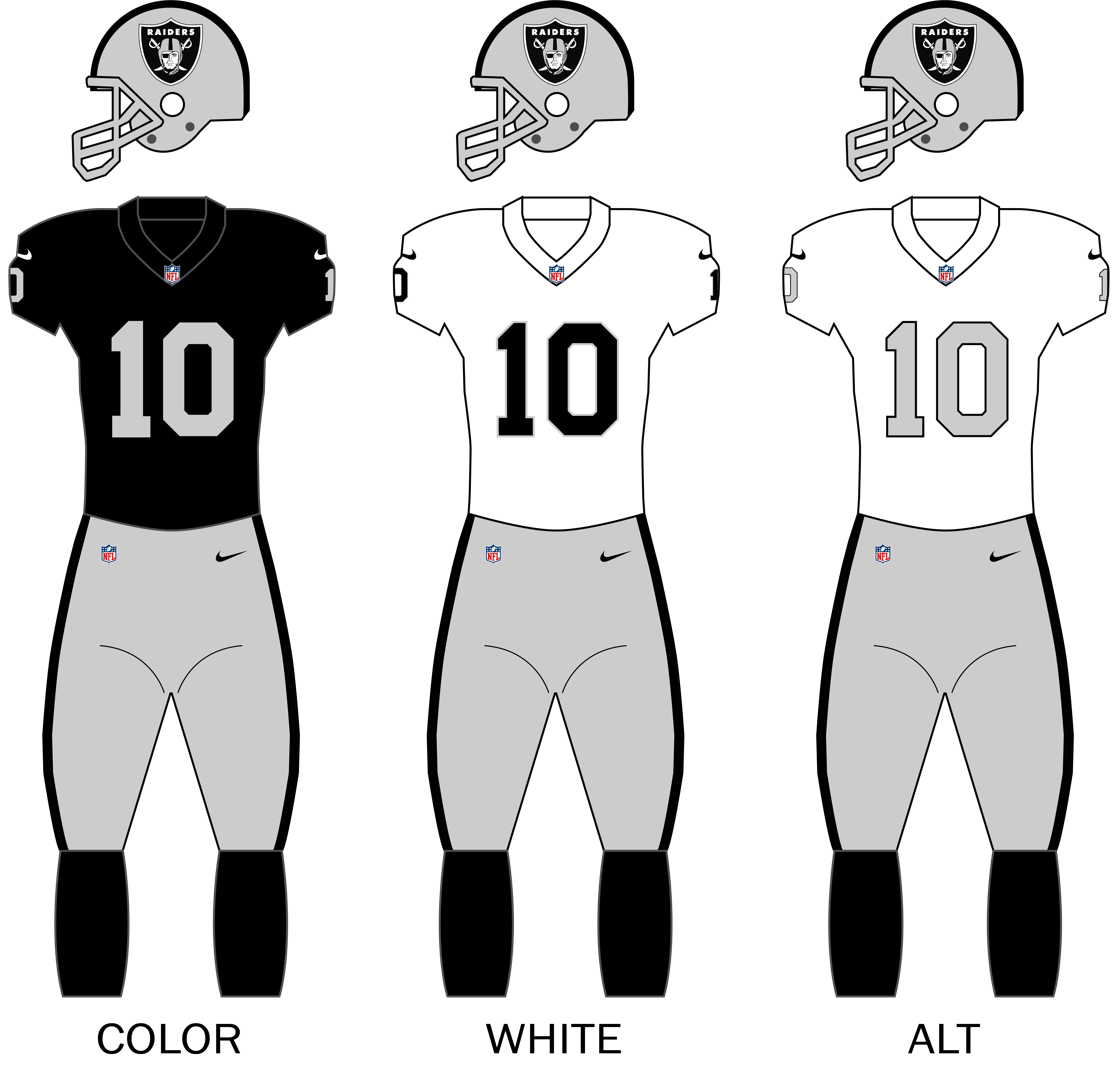

The 2022 season was the Las Vegas Raiders' 53rd season in the National Football League (NFL), their 63rd overall, their third in Las Vegas and their first under the head coach/general manager tandem of Josh McDaniels and Dave Ziegler.

The Raiders started the season with a 2–7 record on their way to a disappointing 6–11 record, missing the playoffs. The Raiders failed to improve on their 10–7 record from the previous season and had their first losing season since 2019. Throughout the season, the Raiders had suffered several blown leads, which included giving up leads by at least 17 points in three games. Nine of their 11 losses were all within one-possession. They became the first team in NFL history to lose five or more times in a season while leading by double-digits in the second half.

== Offseason ==
=== Front office changes ===
On January 17, the team announced that general manager Mike Mayock had been fired after three years with the team. On January 30, the Raiders named longtime New England Patriots' executive Dave Ziegler as their new general manager. On May 6, Raiders' owner Mark Davis announced that team president Dan Ventrelle was no longer with the organization. Following this, Ventrelle alleged that Raiders' owner Mark Davis created a hostile work environment, and once the former president acknowledged this, he was fired. Around May 21, Marcel Reece, already senior advisor and then chief people officer, became team senior vice president, chief of staff. On July 7, the team announced Sandra Douglass Morgan as new president. Morgan is the first black woman in NFL history to assume this role.

=== Coaching changes ===
Interim coach Rich Bisaccia, who replaced Jon Gruden after he resigned five games into the 2021 season due to the publication of homophobic, misogynistic, and racist emails he sent prior to becoming the Raiders head coach, was not assured of returning as head coach despite the Raiders making the playoffs the previous season. Bisaccia did interview for the permanent coaching position. However, the Raiders conducted other interviews as well.

On January 31, the team officially named New England Patriots' offensive coordinator Josh McDaniels the team's new head coach. McDaniels named Mick Lombardi offensive coordinator and Patrick Graham defensive coordinator.

=== Notable free agent acquisitions ===
Position	Player	Age	2021 team
LB	Chandler Jones	32	Arizona Cardinals
LB	Kenny Young	27	Denver Broncos
WR	Keelan Cole	29	New York Jets
WR	Jordan Veasy	27	Houston Texans
DT	Tyler Lancaster	28	Green Bay Packers
TE	Jesper Horsted	25	Chicago Bears
CB	Chris Jones	27	Tennessee Titans
WR	Isaiah Zuber	25	San Francisco 49ers / Cleveland Browns / New York Jets
S	Matthias Farley	30	Tennessee Titans

=== Trades ===
March 17, 2022	To Las Vegas Raiders Rock Ya-Sin	To Indianapolis Colts Yannick Ngakoue
March 18, 2022	To Las Vegas Raiders Davante Adams	To Green Bay Packers 2022 1st round pick (Quay Walker); 2022 2nd round pick
May 13, 2022	To Las Vegas Raiders 2023 5th round pick	To Atlanta Falcons Bryan Edwards; 2023 7th round conditional pick
May 13, 2022	To Las Vegas Raiders Jarrett Stidham; 2023 7th round pick	To New England Patriots 2023 6th round pick
August 17, 2022	To Las Vegas Raiders 2024 7th round conditional pick	To Tennessee Titans Tyree Gillespie
August 22, 2022	To Las Vegas Raiders 2024 7th round conditional pick	To Minnesota Vikings Nick Mullens
August 30, 2022	To Las Vegas Raiders 2023 7th round conditional pick	To Arizona Cardinals Trayvon Mullen
September 21, 2022	To Las Vegas Raiders Justin Herron; 2024 7th round pick	To New England Patriots 2024 6th round pick
October 25, 2022	To Las Vegas Raiders 2023 6th round pick	To Dallas Cowboys Johnathan Hankins; 2024 7th round pick

=== Notable players released ===
Position	Player	Age	2022 team
LB	Nick Kwiatkoski	28	Atlanta Falcons
LB	Cory Littleton	28	Carolina Panthers
DE	Carl Nassib	28	Tampa Bay Buccaneers
RB	Kenyan Drake	28	Baltimore Ravens
OT	Alex Leatherwood	23	Chicago Bears

=== Draft ===
2022 Las Vegas Raiders Draft
Round	Selection	Player	Position	College	Notes
1	22	Traded to Green Bay (Note: The Raiders traded first- and second-round selections to the Green Bay Packers in exchange for WR Davante Adams.)			
2	53	Traded to Green Bay			
3	86	Traded to Tennessee (Note: The Raiders traded a third-round selection (86th overall) to the Tennessee Titans in exchange for third- and fifth-round selections (90th and 169th overall).)			
3	90	Dylan Parham	OG	Memphis	from Tennessee
4	122	Zamir White	RB	Georgia	from Indianapolis via Minnesota (Note: The Raiders traded fourth- and seventh-round selections (126th and 227th overall) to the Minnesota Vikings in exchange for fourth- and seventh-round selections (122nd and 250th overall).)
4	126	Neil Farrell Jr.	DT	LSU	from Las Vegas via Minnesota (Note: The Raiders traded two fifth-round selections (165th and 169th overall) to the Minnesota Vikings in exchange for a fourth-round selection (126th overall).)
5	164	Traded to the Los Angeles Rams (Note: The Raiders traded a fifth-round selection (164th overall) to the Los Angeles Rams in exchange for fifth- and seventh-round selections (175th and 238th overall).)			from New England (Note: The Raiders traded OT Trent Brown and a seventh-round selection (243rd overall) to the New England Patriots in exchange for a fifth-round selection (164th overall).)
5	165	Traded to Minnesota			
5	169	Traded to Minnesota			from Tennessee
5	175	Matthew Butler	DT	Tennessee	from LA Rams
6	199	Traded to Carolina (Note: The Raiders traded a sixth-round selection (199th overall) to the Carolina Panthers in exchange for LB Denzel Perryman and a seventh-round selection (227th overall).)			
7	227	Traded to Minnesota			from Carolina
7	238	Thayer Munford	OT	Ohio State	from Miami via LA Rams
7	243	Traded to New England			
7	250	Brittain Brown	RB	UCLA	from San Francisco via Denver and Minnesota

Draft trades

2022 Las Vegas Raiders undrafted free agents
Name	Position	College	Ref.
Darien Butler	LB	Arizona State	
Qwynnterrio Cole	S	Louisville	
Bryce Cosby	CB	Ball State	
Cole Fotheringham	TE	Utah	
Chase Garbers	QB	California	
Justin Hall	WR	Ball State	
Luke Masterson	LB	Wake Forest	
Sincere McCormick	RB	UTSA	
Malkelm Morrison	CB	Army	
Bamidele Olaseni	OT	Utah	
Isaiah Pola-Mao	S	USC	
Myron Tagovailoa-Amosa	DE	Notre Dame	
Tré Turner	WR	Virginia Tech	
Zach VanValkenburg	DE	Iowa	
Sam Webb	CB	Missouri Western	

== Staff ==
2022 Las Vegas Raiders staff
Front office: Owner – Mark and Carol Davis; President – Sandra Douglass Morgan; Senior vice president/chief strategy officer – Marcel Reece; General manager – Dave Ziegler; Assistant general manager – Champ Kelly; Senior vice president/director of football administration – Tom Delaney; Vice president of football operations – Tom Jones; Director of pro personnel – Dwayne Joseph; Director of football systems – Brad Goldsberry; Director of college scouting – Brandon Yeargan; Assistant director of college scouting – Teddy Atlas; Senior personnel advisor – Shaun Herock; Senior national scout – DuJuan Daniels; Senior national scout – Lenny McGill; National scout – Andy Dengler; Head coaches: Head coach – Josh McDaniels; Offensive coaches: Offensive coordinator – Mick Lombardi; Senior offensive assistant – Jerry Schuplinski; Quarterbacks – Bo Hardegree; Running backs – Kennedy Polamalu; Wide receivers – Edgar Bennett; Offensive line – Carmen Bricillo; Assistant offensive line – Cameron Clemmons; Offensive quality control – Mitch Singler; Offensive assistant – Fred Walker	Defensive coaches: Defensive coordinator – Patrick Graham; Senior defensive assistant – Rob Ryan; Defensive line – Frank Okam; Linebackers – Antonio Pierce; Defensive backs/pass game coordinator – Jason Simmons; Defensive backs – Chris Ash; Defensive quality control – Matt Feeney; Defensive assistant/pass rush specialist – Matt Edwards; Special teams coaches: Special teams coordinator – Tom McMahon; Assistant special teams – Maurice Drayton; Strength and conditioning: Head strength and conditioning – AJ Neibel; Strength and conditioning assistant – Deuce Gruden; Strength and conditioning assistant – D'Anthony Batiste; Strength and conditioning assistant – Rick Slate

== Final roster ==
2022 Las Vegas Raiders roster
Quarterbacks (QB): 4 Derek Carr; 15 Chase Garbers; 3 Jarrett Stidham; Running backs (RB): 22 Ameer Abdullah; 34 Brandon Bolden; 38 Brittain Brown; 28 Josh Jacobs; 45 Jakob Johnson FB; 35 Zamir White; Wide receivers (WR): 17 Davante Adams; 84 Keelan Cole; 10 Mack Hollins; 13 Hunter Renfrow; Tight ends (TE): 80 Jesper Horsted; 87 Foster Moreau; 83 Darren Waller	Offensive linemen (OL): 64 Alex Bars G; 78 Jackson Barton T; 72 Jermaine Eluemunor T; 65 Hroniss Grasu C; 68 Andre James C; 74 Kolton Miller T; 77 Thayer Munford T; 54 Netane Muti G; 66 Dylan Parham G; Defensive linemen (DL): 97 Andrew Billings DT; 96 Tashawn Bower DE; 94 Matthew Butler DT; 98 Maxx Crosby DE; 92 Neil Farrell Jr. DT; 99 Clelin Ferrell DE; 51 Malcolm Koonce DE; 91 Bilal Nichols DT; 93 Kyle Peko DT; 95 Isaac Rochell DE; 90 Jerry Tillery DT	Linebackers (LB): 36 Curtis Bolton MLB; 58 Darien Butler MLB; 56 Harvey Langi OLB; 59 Luke Masterson OLB; Defensive backs (DB): 41 Matthias Farley FS; 37 Tyler Hall CB; 30 Duron Harmon FS; 39 Nate Hobbs CB; 31 Sidney Jones CB; 25 Trevon Moehrig FS; 20 Isaiah Pola-Mao SS; 21 Amik Robertson CB; 33 Roderic Teamer SS; 27 Sam Webb CB; Special teams (ST): 2 Daniel Carlson K; 6 A. J. Cole III P; 47 Trent Sieg LS	Practice squad: 46 Isiah Brown CB; 53 Austin Calitro LB; 44 Bryce Cosby CB; 40 Jalen Elliott SS; 85 Cole Fotheringham TE; 73 Vitaliy Gurman G; 70 Sebastian Gutierrez T; 57 Trent Harris DE; 14 Chris Lacy WR; 43 Kana'i Mauga OLB; 61 Jordan Meredith G; 23 Nickell Robey-Coleman CB; 16 Dillon Stoner WR (PS/I); 69 Myron Tagovailoa-Amosa DT (PS/I); 19 D. J. Turner WR; 32 Austin Walter RB; 89 Isaiah Zuber WR; Reserve: 29 Anthony Averett CB (IR); 50 Jayon Brown OLB (IR); 5 Divine Deablo OLB (IR); 71 Justin Herron T (IR); -- Jordan Jenkins DE (IR); 55 Chandler Jones DE (IR); -- Micah Kiser OLB (IR); -- Sincere McCormick RB (IR); 75 Brandon Parker T (IR); 52 Denzel Perryman MLB (IR); 26 Rock Ya-Sin CB (IR); Rookies in italics 53 active, 11 reserve, 15 practice squad (2 exempt)

== Preseason ==
On February 28, the NFL announced that the Raiders would play the Jacksonville Jaguars in the Pro Football Hall of Fame Game on Thursday, August 4, at Tom Benson Hall of Fame Stadium in Canton, Ohio, at 5:00 p.m. PDT. The Raiders had two former players enter the Hall of Fame, wide receiver Cliff Branch, who died in 2019, as well as defensive tackle Richard Seymour. The two teams will meet again during the regular season in Jacksonville. On May 12, the rest of the Raiders' preseason opponents were announced. The complete preseason schedule was announced on May 18.

The Raiders won all of their preseason games closing with a 4–0 record; it was the first time in team history the Raiders went undefeated in the preseason.

Week	Date	Opponent	Result	Record	Venue	Recap
HOF	August 4	vs. Jacksonville Jaguars	W 27–11	1–0	Tom Benson Hall of Fame Stadium (Canton)	Recap
1	August 14	Minnesota Vikings	W 26–20	2–0	Allegiant Stadium	Recap
2	August 20	at Miami Dolphins	W 15–13	3–0	Hard Rock Stadium	Recap
3	August 26	New England Patriots	W 23–6	4–0	Allegiant Stadium	Recap

== Regular season ==
=== Schedule ===
Week	Date	Opponent	Result	Record	Venue	Recap
1	September 11	at **Los Angeles Chargers**	**L** 19–24	0–1	SoFi Stadium	Recap
2	September 18	Arizona Cardinals	**L** 23–29 (OT)	0–2	Allegiant Stadium	Recap
3	September 25	at Tennessee Titans	**L** 22–24	0–3	Nissan Stadium	Recap
4	October 2	**Denver Broncos**	**W** 32–23	1–3	Allegiant Stadium	Recap
5	October 10	at **Kansas City Chiefs**	**L** 29–30	1–4	Arrowhead Stadium	Recap
6	Bye					
7	October 23	Houston Texans	**W** 38–20	2–4	Allegiant Stadium	Recap
8	October 30	at New Orleans Saints	**L** 0–24	2–5	Caesars Superdome	Recap
9	November 6	at Jacksonville Jaguars	**L** 20–27	2–6	TIAA Bank Field	Recap
10	November 13	Indianapolis Colts	**L** 20–25	2–7	Allegiant Stadium	Recap
11	November 20	at **Denver Broncos**	**W** 22–16 (OT)	3–7	Empower Field at Mile High	Recap
12	November 27	at Seattle Seahawks	**W** 40–34 (OT)	4–7	Lumen Field	Recap
13	December 4	**Los Angeles Chargers**	**W** 27–20	5–7	Allegiant Stadium	Recap
14	December 8	at Los Angeles Rams	**L** 16–17	5–8	SoFi Stadium	Recap
15	December 18	New England Patriots	**W** 30–24	6–8	Allegiant Stadium	Recap
16	December 24	at Pittsburgh Steelers	**L** 10–13	6–9	Acrisure Stadium	Recap
17	January 1	San Francisco 49ers	**L** 34–37 (OT)	6–10	Allegiant Stadium	Recap
18	January 7	**Kansas City Chiefs**	**L** 13–31	6–11	Allegiant Stadium	Recap

Note: Intra-division opponents are in bold text.

=== Game summaries ===
==== Week 1: at Los Angeles Chargers ====
Week 1: Las Vegas Raiders at Los Angeles Chargers – Game summary

Quarter	1	2	3	4	Total
Raiders	3	0	10	6	**19**
**Chargers**	3	14	7	0	**24**

at SoFi Stadium, Inglewood, California

- Date: September 11
- Game time: 1:25 p.m. PDT
- Game weather: None (retractable roof closed)
- Game attendance: 70,240
- Referee: Shawn Smith
- TV announcers (CBS): Kevin Harlan, Trent Green and Melanie Collins
- Recap, Game Book

Game information

**First quarter**

- LAC – Dustin Hopkins 43-yard field goal, 9:03. Chargers 3–0. **Drive: 12 plays, 50 yards, 5:57.**
- LV – Daniel Carlson 23-yard field goal, 2:29. Tied 3–3. **Drive: 14 plays, 70 yards, 6:34.**

**Second quarter**

- LAC – Zander Horvath 1-yard pass from Justin Herbert (Dustin Hopkins kick), 9:34. Chargers 10–3. **Drive: 9 plays, 67 yards, 3:44.**
- LAC – DeAndre Carter 23-yard pass from Justin Herbert (Dustin Hopkins kick), 0:35. Chargers 17–3. **Drive: 2 plays, 31 yards, 0:10.**

**Third quarter**

- LV – Brandon Bolden 18-yard pass from Derek Carr (Daniel Carlson kick), 12:39. Chargers 17–10. **Drive: 5 plays, 75 yards, 2:21.**
- LAC – Gerald Everett 18-yard pass from Justin Herbert (Dustin Hopkins kick), 6:42. Chargers 24–10. **Drive: 11 plays, 73 yards, 5:57.**
- LV – Daniel Carlson 55-yard field goal, 1:03. Chargers 24–13. **Drive: 11 plays, 38 yards, 5:39.**

**Fourth quarter**

- LV – Davante Adams 3-yard pass from Derek Carr (Two-Point pass conversion failed), 4:32. Chargers 24–19. **Drive: 7 plays, 61 yards, 3:01.**

**Top passers**

- LV – Derek Carr – 22/37, 295 yards, 2 TD, 3 INT
- LAC – Justin Herbert – 26/34, 279 yards, 3 TD

**Top rushers**

- LV – Josh Jacobs – 10 rushes, 57 yards
- LAC – Austin Ekeler – 14 rushes, 36 yards

**Top receivers**

- LV – Davante Adams – 10 receptions, 141 yards, TD
- LAC – Keenan Allen – 4 receptions, 66 yards

The Raiders began the season on the road facing their division rival, the Los Angeles Chargers, at SoFi Stadium.

The Chargers got the ball first and moved quickly into Raiders territory before the Vegas defense stiffened and forced the Chargers to settle for a 43-yard field goal and an early 3–0 lead. The Raiders answered by also moving into their opponent's territory and, helped by a Davante Adams catch and run, reached the Chargers four yard line. However, a loss on a Josh Jacobs run and two incomplete passes led to Daniel Carlson's 23-yard field goal to tie the game. Following punts by both teams, the game moved to the second quarter and Justin Herbert hit Zander Horvath on a one-yard touchdown pass to give Los Angeles the 10–3 lead. The Raiders were again forced to punt and the Chargers moved to the Raiders 28. However, they chose to go for it on fourth down and were stuffed by the Raiders defense giving Las Vegas the ball with 1:38 left in the half. Following a sack on the first play of the ensuing possession, Derek Carr was intercepted at midfield and the Chargers returned the ball to the Las Vegas 31 with 45 seconds left in the half. Two plays later, Herbert threw his second toudown pass of the game, a 25-yard score to DeAndre Carter to extend the Los Angeles lead to 17–3 with 35 seconds left in the half. The Raiders chose to kneel on the final play of the half and entered halftime trailing by two touchdowns.

In the second half, the Raiders scored quickly as Carr his Adams for a 41-yard play that moved the ball into Los Angeles territory. Three plays later, Carr hit Brandon Bolden for an 18-yard touchdown to narrow the score to 17–10. However, the Chargers quickly responded as Herbert hit Gerald Everett for an 18-yard touchdown of his own, returning the Chargers' lead to 14. The Raiders moved into Los Angeles territory on the next possession, but were forced to settle for a 55-yard field goal to move within 10. Following a punt by the Chargers early in the fourth quarter, Carr hit Darren Waller for a 23-yard gain, but was intercepted for the second time a play later on a pass intended for Adams at the Chargers two yard line. Following a punt by the Chargers, Carr was intercepted for the third time in the game, giving the Chargers the ball at midfield. After forcing the Chargers to attempt a 49-yard field goal that was no good, Carr moved the Raiders into Los Angeles territory. with less than five minutes remaining in the game, Carr hit Adams for a three-yard touchdown to narrow the score to 24–19. Following an Los Angeles punt, the Raiders took over with 3:30 left in the game. However, Carr was sacked by former Raider Khalil Mack and fumbled the ball giving the Chargers the ball with 1:52 left in the game. The Chargers were able to run out the clock to win the game 24–19.

The loss moved the Raiders to 0–1 on the season. Carr threw for 295 yards in the loss, but had four turnovers (three interceptions and a fumble) in the loss. Adams had 10 receptions for 141 yards and a touchdown in his first game for Vegas.

==== Week 2: vs. Arizona Cardinals ====
Week 2: Arizona Cardinals at Las Vegas Raiders – Game summary

Quarter	1	2	3	4	OT	Total
**Cardinals**	0	0	7	16	6	**29**
Raiders	7	13	3	0	0	**23**

at Allegiant Stadium, Paradise, Nevada

- Date: September 18
- Game time: 1:25 p.m. PDT
- Game weather: None (indoor stadium)
- Game attendance: 61,707
- Referee: Clete Blakeman
- TV announcers (CBS): Greg Gumbel, Adam Archuleta and AJ Ross
- Recap, Game Book

Game information

**First quarter**

- LV – Davante Adams 1-yard pass from Derek Carr (Daniel Carlson kick), 5:22. Raiders 7–0. **Drive: 15 plays, 75 yards, 9:38.**

**Second quarter**

- LV – Daniel Carlson 32-yard field goal, 11:40. Raiders 10–0. **Drive: 9 plays, 66 yards, 4:41.**
- LV – Darren Waller 3-yard pass from Derek Carr (Daniel Carlson kick), 7:00. Raiders 17–0. **Drive: 7 plays, 59 yards, 2:02.**
- LV – Daniel Carlson 55-yard field goal, 0:00. Raiders 20–0. **Drive: 8 plays, 36 yards, 1:51.**

**Third quarter**

- ARI – Greg Dortch 5-yard pass from Kyler Murray (Matt Prater kick), 6:03. Raiders 20–7. **Drive: 11 plays, 79 yards, 5:27.**
- LV – Daniel Carlson 25-yard field goal, 1:38. Raiders 23–7. **Drive: 8 plays, 68 yards, 4:25.**

**Fourth quarter**

- ARI – Darrel Williams 1-yard run (Kyler Murray run), 8:13. Raiders 23–15. **Drive: 9 plays, 54 yards, 3:54.**
- ARI – Kyler Murray 3-yard run (A. J. Green–Kyler Murray pass), 0:00. Tie 23–23. **Drive: 18 plays, 73 yards, 4:33.**

**Overtime**

- ARI – Byron Murphy 59-yard fumble return, 4:05. Cardinals 29–23.

**Top passers**

- ARI – Kyler Murray – 31/49, 277 yards, TD, INT
- LV – Derek Carr – 25/39, 251 yards, 2 TD

**Top rushers**

- ARI – Darrel Williams – 8 rushes, 59 yards, TD
- LV – Josh Jacobs – 19 rushes, 69 yards

**Top receivers**

- ARI – Zach Ertz – 7 receptions, 67 yards
- LV – Mack Hollins – 5 receptions, 66 yards

The Raiders, playing in their home opener at Allegiant Stadium, blew a 20–0 lead and lost, in overtime, to a struggling Cardinals team still reeling from a Week 1 home defeat. Derek Carr threw two touchdown passes, one to Davante Adams and the other to Darren Waller, while Daniel Carlson added two field goals to provide the 20-point margin. However, in the second half, Arizona began to come back. It started when Greg Dortsch caught a five-yard touchdown pass from Kyler Murray to cut the lead to 20–7. The Raiders however, responded with aCarlson field goal to give Las Vegas a 23–7 lead to start the fourth quarter. However, the Cardinals quickly answered on Darrel Williams one-yard touchdown run. Murray scrambled in to add the two-point conversion to narrow the lead to 23–15. Following a punt by the Raiders, he Cardinals moved downfield on an 18-play drive capped off with Murray running in for a three-yard touchdown to pull with two as the quarter ended. Murray's throw to A. J. Green on the two-point conversion tied the game at 23. In overtime, the Cardinals received the ball, but turned it over on fourth down, giving the ball back to the Raiders. However, Raiders' receiver Hunter Renfrow fumbled the ball on the ensuing Raiders drive and Cardinals' defender Byron Murphy recovered and returned the fumble 59 yards for the game-winning touchdown. The Raiders lost 29–23 and fell to 0–2 on the season.

The 20-point blown lead set a new franchise record for largest blown lead in franchise history.

==== Week 3: at Tennessee Titans ====
Week 3: Las Vegas Raiders at Tennessee Titans – Game summary

Quarter	1	2	3	4	Total
Raiders	3	7	3	9	**22**
**Titans**	7	17	0	0	**24**

at Nissan Stadium, Nashville, Tennessee

- Date: September 25
- Game time: 12:00 p.m. CDT/10:00 a.m. PDT
- Game weather: Cloudy, 77 °F (25 °C)
- Game attendance: 68,649
- Referee: Brad Rogers
- TV announcers (Fox): Kenny Albert, Jonathan Vilma and Shannon Spake
- Recap, Game Book

Game information

**First quarter**

- TEN – Geoff Swaim 2-yard pass from Ryan Tannehill (Randy Bullock kick), 7:22. Titans 7–0. **Drive: 12 plays, 75 yards, 7:38.**
- LV – Daniel Carlson 21-yard field goal, 2:19. Titans 7–3. **Drive: 9 plays, 72 yards, 5:03.**

**Second quarter**

- TEN – Derrick Henry 1-yard run (Randy Bullock kick), 14:25. Titans 14–3. **Drive: 6 plays, 75 yards, 2:54.**
- LV – Davante Adams 5-yard pass from Derek Carr (Daniel Carlson kick), 9:44. Titans 14–10. **Drive: 7 plays, 75 yards, 4:41.**
- TEN – Ryan Tannehill 1-yard run (Randy Bullock kick), 4:55. Titans 21–10. **Drive: 8 plays, 79 yards, 4:49.**
- TEN – Randy Bullock 48-yard field goal, 0:00. Titans 24–10. **Drive: 3 plays, 19 yards, 0:21.**

**Third quarter**

- LV – Daniel Carlson 32-yard field goal, 6:57. Titans 24–13. **Drive: 14 plays, 61 yards, 8:03.**

**Fourth quarter**

- LV – Daniel Carlson 35-yard field goal, 3:29. Titans 24–16. **Drive: 7 plays, 63 yards, 2:39.**
- LV – Mack Hollins 9-yard pass from Derek Carr (two-point pass failed), 1:14. Titans 24–22. **Drive: 14 plays, 81 yards, 1:43.**

**Top passers**

- LV – Derek Carr – 26/44, 303 yards, 2 TD, INT
- TEN – Ryan Tannehill – 19/27, 264 yards, TD, INT

**Top rushers**

- LV – Josh Jacobs – 13 rushes, 66 yards
- TEN – Derrick Henry – 20 rushes, 85 yards, TD

**Top receivers**

- LV – Mack Hollins – 8 receptions, 158 yards, TD
- TEN – Robert Woods – 4 receptions, 85 yards

With an 0–2 record to the start the season, the Raiders traveled to Nashville to face the Titans. Following a Ryan Tannehill touchdown pass to give the Titans a 7–0 lead, Daniel Carlson connected on a 21-yard field goal to narrow the lead to four. Derrick Henry scored on the next Titans' possession to push the lead to 14–3 early in the second quarter. Derek Carr answered the score, hitting Davante Adams on a 5-yard touchdown pass to pull with four. Tannehill returned the Titans' lead to 11 with a one-yard touchdown run with under five minutes left in the half. Neither team could manage much on the next few possessions before the Titans took over at midfield with 21 second left in the half. A Randy Bullock field goal as time expired gave Tennessee the 24–10 halftime lead. A Carlson field goal accounted for all the scoring in the third quarter despite a Tannehill interception. The Titans turned the ball over on downs early in the fourth quarter, but Carr was intercepted on the subsequent possession. Following a punt by the Titans, Carlson hit another field goal to narrow the lead to eight with 3:29 left in the game. The Raider defense forced a punt on the next possession and the Raiders took over with 2:57 left and down by eight. Carr hit Mack Hollis on a nine-yard touchdown pass with 1:14 left in the game. Needing a two-point conversion to tie the game, Carr's pass to Darren Waller was incomplete. The ensuing onside kick failed and the Titans ran out the clock as the Raiders lost 24–22. The loss dropped Las Vegas to 0–3 on the season.

==== Week 4: vs. Denver Broncos ====
Week 4: Denver Broncos at Las Vegas Raiders – Game summary

Quarter	1	2	3	4	Total
Broncos	7	9	0	7	**23**
**Raiders**	3	16	3	10	**32**

at Allegiant Stadium, Paradise, Nevada

- Date: October 2
- Game time: 1:25 p.m. PDT
- Game weather: None (indoor stadium)
- Game attendance: 62,332
- Referee: Land Clark
- TV announcers (CBS): Kevin Harlan, Trent Green and Melanie Collins
- Recap, Game Book

Game information

**First quarter**

- LV – Daniel Carlson 26-yard field goal, 9:52. Raiders 3–0. **Drive: 11 plays, 60 yards, 5:08.**
- DEN – Courtland Sutton 5-yard pass from Russell Wilson (Brandon McManus kick), 2:45. Broncos 7–3. **Drive: 4 plays, 34 yards, 2:09.**

**Second quarter**

- LV – Josh Jacobs 5-yard run (Daniel Carlson kick), 11:46. Raiders 10–7. **Drive: 11 plays, 75 yards, 5:59.**
- DEN – Brandon McManus 28-yard field goal, 8:03. Tied 10–10. **Drive: 7 plays, 39 yards, 3:42.**
- LV – Amik Robertson 68-yard fumble return (kick failed), 3:15. Raiders 16–10.
- DEN – Jerry Jeudy 20-yard pass from Russell Wilson (kick failed), 1:24. Tied 16–16. **Drive: 5 plays, 75 yards, 1:51.**
- LV – Daniel Carlson 39-yard field goal, 0:00. Raiders 19–16. **Drive: 10 plays, 54 yards, 1:24.**

**Third quarter**

- LV – Daniel Carlson 22-yard field goal, 2:27. Raiders 22–16. **Drive: 10 plays, 77 yards, 4:42.**

**Fourth quarter**

- LV – Daniel Carlson 30-yard field goal, 9:50. Raiders 25–16. **Drive: 6 plays, 38 yards, 3:15.**
- DEN – Russell Wilson 3-yard run (Brandon McManus kick), 7:16. Raiders 25–23. **Drive: 6 plays, 75 yards, 2:34.**
- LV – Josh Jacobs 7-yard run (Daniel Carlson kick), 2:02. Raiders 32–23. **Drive: 10 plays, 75 yards, 5:14.**

**Top passers**

- DEN – Russell Wilson – 17/25, 237 yards, 2 TD
- LV – Derek Carr – 21/34, 188 yards

**Top rushers**

- DEN – Russell Wilson – 4 rushes, 29 yards, TD
- LV – Josh Jacobs – 28 rushes, 144 yards, 2 TD

**Top receivers**

- DEN – K. J. Hamler – 1 reception, 55 yards
- LV – Davante Adams – 9 receptions, 101 yards

Still looking for their first win on the season, the Raiders returned home to face the Broncos. An early Daniel Carlson field goal gave the Raiders a 3–0 lead. Following punts by both teams, Russell Wilson threw a five-yard touchdown pass to give the Broncos a 7–3 lead. Josh Jacobs answered with a 10-yard touchdown run to return the Vegas lead to three early in the second quarter. After the Broncos tied it on a field goal, Amik Robertson returned a Melvin Gordon fumble 68 yards for a 16–10 lead after Carlson missed the extra point. Wilson answered with a 20-yard touchdown pass and a failed kick on the extra point left the game tied at 16. A Carlson 39-yard field goal as the half ended gave the Raiders a 19–16 lead at halftime. Carlson added two more field goals as the game moved to the fourth quarter with the Raiders ahead 25–16. Wilson scored on a three-yard run with seven minutes left in the game to narrow the lead to 25–23. Jacobs second touchdown run of the game with just over two minutes remaining sealed the win for the Raiders. The 32–23 win marked the Raiders first win of the season. Jacobs rushed for 144 yards on 28 attempts and two touchdowns in the win.

==== Week 5: at Kansas City Chiefs ====
Week 5: Las Vegas Raiders at Kansas City Chiefs – Game summary

Quarter	1	2	3	4	Total
Raiders	7	13	0	9	**29**
**Chiefs**	0	10	14	6	**30**

at Arrowhead Stadium, Kansas City, Missouri

- Date: October 10
- Game time: 7:15 p.m. CDT/5:15 p.m. PDT
- Game weather: Cloudy, 77 °F (25 °C)
- Game attendance: 73,523
- Referee: Carl Cheffers
- TV announcers (KLAS-TV/ESPN): Joe Buck, Troy Aikman and Lisa Salters
- Recap, Game Book

Game information

**First quarter**

- LV – Davante Adams 58-yard pass from Derek Carr (Daniel Carlson kick), 8:27. Raiders 7–0. **Drive: 4 plays, 67 yards, 2:52.**

**Second quarter**

- LV – Josh Jacobs 1-yard run (Daniel Carlson kick), 14:00. Raiders 14–0. **Drive: 10 plays, 69 yards, 5:03.**
- LV – Daniel Carlson 53-yard field goal, 9:22. Raiders 17–0. **Drive: 6 plays, 43 yards, 3:03.**
- KC – Travis Kelce 1-yard pass from Patrick Mahomes (Matthew Wright kick), 4:40. Raiders 17–7. **Drive: 11 plays, 75 yards, 4:42.**
- LV – Daniel Carlson 50-yard field goal, 0:17. Raiders 20–7. **Drive: 9 plays, 43 yards, 4:23.**
- KC – Matthew Wright 59-yard field goal, 0:00. Raiders 20–10. **Drive: 4 plays, 34 yards, 0:17.**

**Third quarter**

- KC – Travis Kelce 4-yard pass from Patrick Mahomes (Matthew Wright kick), 9:25. Raiders 20–17. **Drive: 12 plays, 75 yards, 5:35.**
- KC – Travis Kelce 8-yard pass from Patrick Mahomes (Matthew Wright kick), 3:20. Chiefs 24–20. **Drive: 8 plays, 57 yards, 3:44.**

**Fourth quarter**

- LV – Daniel Carlson 47-yard field goal, 14:05. Chiefs 24–23. **Drive: 8 plays, 55 yards, 4:15.**
- KC – Travis Kelce 1-yard pass from Patrick Mahomes (pass failed), 7:25. Chiefs 30–23. **Drive: 13 plays, 65 yards, 6:40.**
- LV – Davante Adams 48-yard pass from Derek Carr (run failed), 4:27. Chiefs 30–29. **Drive: 7 plays, 75 yards, 2:58.**

**Top passers**

- LV – Derek Carr – 19/30, 241 yards, 2 TD
- KC – Patrick Mahomes – 29/43, 292 yards, 4 TD

**Top rushers**

- LV – Josh Jacobs – 21 rushes, 154 yards, TD
- KC – Jerick McKinnon – 8 rushes, 53 yards

**Top receivers**

- LV – Davante Adams – 3 receptions, 124 yards, 2 TD
- KC – Marquez Valdes-Scantling – 6 receptions, 90 yards

The Raiders next traveled to Kansas City to face the Chiefs on Monday Night Football. The Raiders blew a 17–0 lead and lost to the Chiefs, 30–29. The Raiders took the lead early in the first quarter when Derek Carr hit Davante Adams on a 58-yard touchdown pass. Following a missed field goal by the Chiefs, Josh Jacobs scored on a one-yard run to give the Raiders a 14–0 lead early in the second quarter. A Daniel Carlson field goal pushed the lead to 17 before Patrick Mahomes led the Chiefs on a six play, 43-yard drive to narrow the lead to 17–7. Carlson's second field goal of the game with 17 seconds left in the half pushed the lead to 20–7. However, Mahomes quickly put the Chiefs in field goal position and Matthew Wright's 59-yard field goal as the half ended left the Raiders ahead 20–10 at the half. The Chiefs narrowed the lead to three as Mahomes hit Travis Kelce for his second touchdown in the game on the first drive of the second half. Following a punt, Mahomes hit Kelce again to give Kansas City the 24–20 lead. Carlson's field goal early in the fourth quarter left the Raiders trailing by one point. Kelce's fourth touchdown catch of the game and a missed two-point conversion left Las Vegas trailing 30–23 with seven minutes left. Carr answered the score, hitting Adams again on a 48-yard touchdown pass to bring the Raiders within a point with 4:27 remaining. Electing to try for two to take the lead, Jacobs was stuffed as the conversion failed. Still trailing by one, the Raiders forced the Chiefs to punt with 2:29 left. Las Vegas was able to move to midfield, but time ran out as the Raiders lost 30–29. Jacobs ran for 154 yards in the loss.

==== Week 7: vs. Houston Texans ====
Week 7: Houston Texans at Las Vegas Raiders – Game summary

Quarter	1	2	3	4	Total
Texans	0	10	10	0	**20**
**Raiders**	3	7	7	21	**38**

at Allegiant Stadium, Paradise, Nevada

- Date: October 23
- Game time: 1:05 p.m. PDT
- Game weather: None (indoor stadium)
- Game attendance: 61,228
- Referee: John Hussey
- TV announcers (CBS): Greg Gumbel, Adam Archuleta and AJ Ross
- Recap, Game Book

Game information

**First quarter**

- LV – Daniel Carlson 50-yard field goal, 9:54. Raiders 3–0. **Drive: 11 plays, 44 yards, 5:06.**

**Second quarter**

- HOU – Chris Moore 13-yard pass from Davis Mills (Kaʻimi Fairbairn kick), 10:17. Texans 7–3. **Drive: 13 plays, 62 yards, 6:22.**
- HOU – Kaʻimi Fairbairn 55-yard field goal, 4:57. Texans 10–3. **Drive: 7 plays, 43 yards, 2:31.**
- LV – Mack Hollins 26-yard pass from Derek Carr (Daniel Carlson kick), 0:25. Tied 10–10. **Drive: 10 plays, 82 yards, 4:32.**

**Third quarter**

- HOU – Kaʻimi Fairbairn 35-yard field goal, 10:59. Texans 13–10. **Drive: 8 plays, 67 yards, 4:01.**
- LV – Josh Jacobs 4-yard run (Daniel Carlson kick), 5:48. Raiders 17–13. **Drive: 10 plays, 75 yards, 5:11.**
- HOU – Phillip Dorsett 25-yard pass from Davis Mills (Kaʻimi Fairbairn kick), 3:14. Texans 20–17. **Drive: 6 plays, 74 yards, 2:34.**

**Fourth quarter**

- LV – Josh Jacobs 7-yard run (Daniel Carlson kick), 13:32. Raiders 24–20. **Drive: 7 plays, 76 yards, 4:42.**
- LV – Josh Jacobs 15-yard run (Daniel Carlson kick), 7:06. Raiders 31–20. **Drive: 7 plays, 81 yards, 4:15.**
- LV – Duron Harmon 73-yard interception return (Daniel Carlson kick), 3:26. Raiders 38–20.

**Top passers**

- HOU – Davis Mills – 28/41, 302 yards, 2 TD, INT
- LV – Derek Carr – 21/27, 241 yards, TD

**Top rushers**

- HOU – Dameon Pierce – 20 rushes, 92 yards
- LV – Josh Jacobs – 20 rushes, 143 yards, 3 TD

**Top receivers**

- HOU – Jordan Akins – 3 receptions, 68 yards
- LV – Davante Adams – 8 receptions, 95 yards

After a bye week, the Raiders looked to turn around their season as they faced the Texans in Las Vegas. In a must-win game for both teams, Las Vegas would come out on top. The Raiders scored the only points of the first quarter by virtue of a 50-yard field goal by Daniel Carlson, only to let the Texans score 10 unanswered points to swipe the lead from them in the second quarter, via a 13-yard touchdown pass from Davis Mills to Chris Moore, and a 55-yard field goal from Ka'imi Fairbairn. A 26-yard touchdown pass from Derek Carr to Mack Hollins tied the game at 10 at the half. The lead seesawed for the whole third quarter. To open the second half, Ka'imi Fairbairn reclaimed the Texans' lead on a 35-yard field goal, making the score 13-10 in favor of them. The Raiders swiped the lead back with a 4-yard touchdown run from Josh Jacobs to put Vegas up 17-13. Davis Mills connected with Phillip Dorsett for a 25-yard touchdown pass, putting the Texans up 20-17, and once again swiping the lead from the Raiders. However, in the fourth quarter, it was all Raiders, as they scored the final 21 points, largely courtesy of Josh Jacobs, who found the end zone twice more. He ran in a second touchdown from 7 yards out to put the Raiders up, 24-20, and with 7:06 left on the clock, Jacobs would run in his third and last touchdown of the day, from 15 yards out, to give the Raiders a 31-20 lead. The epilogue of the game came when Duron Harmon recorded a pick six off of Mills, reaching the final score of 38–20, and giving the Raiders just what they needed.

With the win, the Raiders improved to 2–4. Overall, Josh Jacobs ran for 143 yards on 20 attempts and 3 touchdowns, averaging 7.2 yards per carry in the win.

==== Week 8: at New Orleans Saints ====
Week 8: Las Vegas Raiders at New Orleans Saints – Game summary

Quarter	1	2	3	4	Total
Raiders	0	0	0	0	**0**
**Saints**	7	10	7	0	**24**

at Caesars Superdome, New Orleans, Louisiana

- Date: October 30
- Game time: 12:00 p.m. CDT/10:00 a.m. PDT
- Game weather: None (indoor stadium)
- Game attendance: 70,009
- Referee: Scott Novak
- TV announcers (CBS): Kevin Harlan, Trent Green and Melanie Collins
- Recap, Game Book

Game information

**First quarter**

- NO – Alvin Kamara 3-yard run (Wil Lutz kick), 1:32. Saints 7–0. **Drive: 11 plays, 84 yards, 6:43.**

**Second quarter**

- NO – Wil Lutz 37-yard field goal, 12:43. Saints 10–0. **Drive: 4 plays, 9 yards, 1:35.**
- NO – Alvin Kamara 16-yard pass from Andy Dalton (Wil Lutz kick), 7:15. Saints 17–0. **Drive: 6 plays, 45 yards, 3:54.**

**Third quarter**

- NO – Alvin Kamara 36-yard pass from Andy Dalton (Wil Lutz kick), 11:03. Saints 24–0. **Drive: 7 plays, 75 yards, 3:57.**

**Fourth quarter**

- No scoring plays.

**Top passers**

- LV – Derek Carr – 15/26, 101 yards, INT
- NO – Andy Dalton – 22/30, 229 yards, 2 TD

**Top rushers**

- LV – Josh Jacobs – 10 rushes, 43 yards
- NO – Alvin Kamara – 18 rushes, 62 yards, TD

**Top receivers**

- LV – Mack Hollins – 7 receptions, 64 yards
- NO – Alvin Kamara – 9 receptions, 96 yards, 2 TD

Traveling to face the Saints in New Orleans, the Raiders' offense struggled mightily, punting on their first three possessions. Meanwhile, the Saints, led by backup quarterback Andy Dalton, took a 7–0 lead on an Alvin Kamara three-yard touchdown run late in the first quarter. The Raiders attempted a fake punt on their first possession of the second quarter which failed and gave the Saints the ball in Raiders' territory. A 37-yard field goal by Wil Lutz made it 10–0. Following an interception of a Derek Carr pass on the ensuing possession, the Saints moved the lead to 17 on a touchdown pass from Dalton to Kamara. The Raiders offense punted on its only other possession of the first half and a missed field goal by Lutz as the half ended left the Raiders behind 17–0 at halftime. The second half was no different than the first for the Raiders as they were forced to punt before Dalton again hit Kamara for a touchdown pass to extend the lead to 24. Las Vegas was forced to punt on their next two possessions and although the Saints failed to score again, the Raiders turned to backups for their final possession. They were shut out 24–0 in the game and fell to 2–5 on the season.

==== Week 9: at Jacksonville Jaguars ====
Week 9: Las Vegas Raiders at Jacksonville Jaguars – Game summary

Quarter	1	2	3	4	Total
Raiders	7	13	0	0	**20**
**Jaguars**	0	10	7	10	**27**

at TIAA Bank Field, Jacksonville, Florida

- Date: November 6
- Game time: 1:00 p.m. EST/10:00 a.m. PST
- Game weather: 81 °F (27 °C)
- Game attendance: 62,758
- Referee: Bill Vinovich
- TV announcers (CBS): Andrew Catalon, James Lofton and Aditi Kinkhabwala
- Recap, Game Book

Game information

**First quarter**

- LV – Davante Adams 25-yard pass from Derek Carr (Daniel Carlson kick), 4:45. Raiders 7–0. **Drive: 10 plays, 71 yards, 5:28.**

**Second quarter**

- LV – Daniel Carlson 38-yard field goal, 14:08. Raiders 10–0. **Drive: 8 plays, 36 yards, 3:56.**
- LV – Davante Adams 38-yard pass from Derek Carr (Daniel Carlson kick), 10:51. Raiders 17–0. **Drive: 3 plays, 69 yards, 1:42.**
- JAX – Travis Etienne 1-yard run (Riley Patterson kick), 4:50. Raiders 17–7. **Drive: 10 plays, 75 yards, 6:01.**
- LV – Daniel Carlson 38-yard field goal, 0:45. Raiders 20–7. **Drive: 11 plays, 55 yards, 4:05.**
- JAX – Riley Patterson 44-yard field goal, 0:00. Raiders 20–10. **Drive: 8 plays, 49 yards, 0:45.**

**Third quarter**

- JAX – Christian Kirk 7-yard pass from Trevor Lawrence (Riley Patterson kick), 10:15. Raiders 20–17. **Drive: 9 plays, 45 yards, 4:45.**

**Fourth quarter**

- JAX – Travis Etienne 5-yard run (Riley Patterson kick), 14:56. Jaguars 24–20. **Drive: 12 plays, 82 yards, 7:06.**
- JAX – Riley Patterson 48-yard field goal, 1:03. Jaguars 27–20. **Drive: 4 plays, 9 yards, 1:22.**

**Top passers**

- LV – Derek Carr – 22/36, 259 yards, 2 TD
- JAX – Trevor Lawrence – 25/31, 235 yards, TD

**Top rushers**

- LV – Josh Jacobs – 17 rushes, 67 yards
- JAX – Travis Etienne – 28 rushes, 109 yards, 2 TD

**Top receivers**

- LV – Davante Adams – 10 receptions, 146 yards, 2 TD
- JAX – Christian Kirk – 8 receptions, 76 yards, TD

The Raiders next traveled to Jacksonville to face the Jaguars. After punting on their first possession, the Raiders allowed the Jaguars to move into Raiders territory, but a fumble ended the drive. Derek Carr hit Davante Adams on a 25-yard touchdown pass to give the Raiders a 7–0 lead. A Daniel Carlson field goal pushed the lead to 10 before Carr hit Adams again, this time from 38 yards, to take a 17–0 lead. The Jaguars answered with a touchdown run by Travis Etienne to narrow the lead to 10. Another Carlson field goal was answered by a Jaguars' field goal as the half ended with a 20–10 Raiders lead. The Jaguars narrowed the lead to three on a Trevor Lawrence touchdown pass on the first possession of the second half. The Raiders offense struggled again for the remainder of the half, allowing another Etienne touchdown run to give the Jaguars a 24–20 lead. A Jaguars field goal moved the lead to seven while the Raider offense could not muster any more points. As a result, the Raiders fell 27–20. It was Las Vegas' third blown lead of 17 points or more on the season. With the loss, Las Vegas fell to 2–6 on the season.

==== Week 10: vs. Indianapolis Colts ====
Week 10: Indianapolis Colts at Las Vegas Raiders – Game summary

Quarter	1	2	3	4	Total
**Colts**	7	6	6	6	**25**
Raiders	0	7	7	6	**20**

at Allegiant Stadium, Paradise, Nevada

- Date: November 13
- Game time: 1:05 p.m. PST
- Game weather: None (indoor stadium)
- Game attendance: 62,197
- Referee: Tra Blake
- TV announcers (CBS): Kevin Harlan, Trent Green and Melanie Collins
- Recap, Game Book

Game information

**First quarter**

- IND – Matt Ryan 1-yard run (Chase McLaughlin kick), 3:17. Colts 7–0. **Drive: 11 plays, 70 yards, 6:34.**

**Second quarter**

- IND – Chase McLaughlin 48-yard field goal, 12:38. Colts 10–0. **Drive: 10 plays, 50 yards, 4:46.**
- LV – Foster Moreau 4-yard pass from Derek Carr (Daniel Carlson kick), 0:58. Colts 10–7. **Drive: 12 plays, 79 yards, 5:40.**
- IND – Chase McLaughlin 48-yard field goal, 0:00. Colts 13–7. **Drive: 7 plays, 45 yards, 0:58.**

**Third quarter**

- LV – Josh Jacobs 1-yard run (Daniel Carlson kick), 1:51. Raiders 14–13. **Drive: 11 plays, 70 yards, 6:34.**
- IND – Jonathan Taylor 66-yard run (pass failed), 1:01. Colts 19–13. **Drive: 2 plays, 70 yards, 0:50.**

**Fourth quarter**

- LV – Davante Adams 48-yard pass from Derek Carr (pass failed), 11:36. Raiders 20–19. **Drive: 3 plays, 48 yards, 0:56.**
- IND – Parris Campbell 35-yard pass from Matt Ryan (pass failed), 5:07. Colts 25–20. **Drive: 5 plays, 82 yards, 2:53.**

**Top passers**

- IND – Matt Ryan – 21/28, 222 yards, TD
- LV – Derek Carr – 24/38, 248 yards, 2 TD

**Top rushers**

- IND – Jonathan Taylor – 22 rushes, 147 yards, TD
- LV – Josh Jacobs – 21 rushes, 78 yards, TD

**Top receivers**

- IND – Parris Campbell – 7 receptions, 76 yards, TD
- LV – Davante Adams – 9 receptions, 126 yards, TD

The Raiders returned home to face the Colts and new head coach Jeff Saturday. The Raiders offense continued to struggle, failing to score on its first four possessions. A Matt Ryan one-yard run gave the Colts 7–0 lead late in the first quarter. A Colts' field goal pushed the lead to 10 early in the second quarter. With less than two minutes left in the half, Derek Car hit Foster Moreau for a four-yard touchdown pass to narrow the lead to three. However, the Las Vegas defense allowed the Colts to push the ball to the Raider 30 with three seconds left in the half. A field goal pushed the Colts' lead to 13–7 at the half. After a missed field goal by Indianapolis to start the second half, Josh Jacobs scored on a one-yard run to give the Raiders their first lead, 14–13. However, on the first play of the ensuing possession, Jonathan Taylor scored on a 66-yard run to restore the Colts' lead. A failed two-point conversion left the score at 19–14. Carr next hit Davante Adams on 48-yard touchdown pass to take a 20–19 lead after the failed two-point conversion. Following punts by both teams, Matt Ryan hit Parris Campbell on a 35-yard touchdown pass. The two-point conversion failed again, leaving the lead 25–20. Vegas was able to move deep into Indy territory, but the drive stalled at the Colts' 16 and Derek Carr's fourth down pass fell incomplete with 47 second left as the Raiders lost again, 25–20. The loss dropped the Raiders to 2–7 on the season. The Raiders were also the only team to lose to the Colts under Jeff Saturday.

==== Week 11: at Denver Broncos ====
Week 11: Las Vegas Raiders at Denver Broncos – Game summary

Quarter	1	2	3	4	OT	Total
**Raiders**	0	7	3	6	6	**22**
Broncos	7	3	0	6	0	**16**

at Empower Field at Mile High, Denver, Colorado

- Date: November 20
- Game time: 2:05 p.m. MST/1:05 p.m. PST
- Game weather: Sunny, 46 °F (8 °C)
- Game attendance: 76,056
- Referee: Shawn Smith
- TV announcers (Fox): Adam Amin, Mark Schlereth and Kristina Pink
- Recap, Game Book

Game information

**First quarter**

- DEN – Latavius Murray 1-yard run (Brandon McManus kick), 6:22. Broncos 7–0. **Drive: 7 plays, 92 yards, 3:30**

**Second quarter**

- DEN – Brandon McManus 48-yard field goal, 9:19. Broncos 10–0. **Drive: 8 plays, 34 yards, 3:07.**
- LV – Davante Adams 31-yard pass from Derek Carr (Daniel Carlson kick), 5:36. Broncos 10–7. **Drive: 8 plays, 75 yards, 3:43.**

**Third quarter**

- LV – Daniel Carlson 52-yard field goal, 10:37. Tied 10–10. **Drive: 5 plays, 20 yards, 2:15.**

**Fourth quarter**

- DEN – Brandon McManus 52-yard field goal, 14:56. Broncos 13–10. **Drive: 9 plays, 38 yards, 4:39.**
- LV – Daniel Carlson 57-yard field goal, 7:06. Tied 13–13. **Drive: 10 plays, 26 yards, 4:56.**
- DEN – Brandon McManus 48-yard field goal, 3:30. Broncos 16–13. **Drive: 8 plays, 52 yards, 3:36.**
- LV – Daniel Carlson 25-yard field goal, 0:16. Tied 16–16. **Drive: 7 plays, 71 yards, 1:27.**

**Overtime**

- LV – Davante Adams 35-yard pass from Derek Carr, 8:24. Raiders 22–16. **Drive: 3 plays, 67 yards, 1:36.**

**Top passers**

- LV – Derek Carr – 23/37, 307 yards, 2 TD
- DEN – Russell Wilson – 24/31, 247 yards

**Top rushers**

- LV – Josh Jacobs – 24 rushes, 109 yards
- DEN – Latavius Murray – 17 rushes, 49 yards, TD

**Top receivers**

- LV – Davante Adams – 7 receptions, 141 yards, 2 TD
- DEN – Courtland Sutton – 5 receptions, 80 yards

The Raiders returned to the road to face division foe, Denver, one of only two teams the Raiders had beat on the season. The Broncos scored first on the second possession of the game on a one-yard run by former Raider Latavius Murray. Daniel Carlson missed his first field goal of the season on Vegas' next possession and a Brandon McManus field goal pushed the Denver lead to 10. The Raiders finally got on the board when Derek Carr hit Davante Adams for a 31-yard touchdown pass to bring the score to 10–7 with less than six minutes left in the half. The Broncos moved into Raider territory as the half drew to a close, but the Raiders were able to force Denver to settle for a 25-yard field goal that was blocked by Maxx Crosby. A Carlson field goal started the scoring in the second half and moved the score to 10–10. Neither offense could muster any more points in the third quarter. McManus kicked another field goal, this time from 52 yards out to move the score to 13–10. Carlson added a 57-yard field goal with 7:11 remaining in the fourth quarter to tie the game. The Broncos retook the lead four minutes later with 48-yard field goal to move the lead to 16–13. After exchanging punts, the Raiders moved to the Denver seven, but were forced to settle for a field goal with 16 seconds left to tie the game. As the game moved to overtime, the Raiders won the toss and took the ball. On the third play of overtime, Carr threw to a wide open Davante Adams for 35-yard touchdown to end the game at 22–16. The win moved the Raiders to 3–7 on the season.

==== Week 12: at Seattle Seahawks ====
Week 12: Las Vegas Raiders at Seattle Seahawks – Game summary

Quarter	1	2	3	4	OT	Total
**Raiders**	7	17	3	7	6	**40**
Seahawks	10	10	7	7	0	**34**

at Lumen Field, Seattle, Washington

- Date: November 27
- Game time: 1:05 p.m. PST
- Game weather: Partly cloudy, 45 °F (7 °C)
- Game attendance: 68,849
- Referee: Brad Allen
- TV announcers (CBS): Greg Gumbel, Adam Archuleta and AJ Ross
- Recap, Game Book

Game information

**First quarter**

- SEA – Kenneth Walker III 12-yard run (Jason Myers kick), 14:32. Seahawks 7–0. **Drive: 2 plays, 12 yards, 0:13.**
- LV – Ameer Abdullah 18-yard pass from Derek Carr (Daniel Carlson kick), 9:24. Tied 7–7. **Drive: 11 plays, 75 yards, 5:08.**
- SEA – Jason Myers 24-yard field goal, 4:23. Seahawks 10–7. **Drive: 5 plays, 29 yards, 1:32.**

**Second quarter**

- SEA – Jason Myers 34-yard field goal, 13:34. Seahawks 13–7. **Drive: 8 plays, 47 yards, 4:06.**
- LV – Mack Hollins 36-yard pass from Derek Carr (Daniel Carlson kick), 10:02. Raiders 14–13. **Drive: 6 plays, 61 yards, 3:32.**
- LV – Josh Jacobs 30-yard run (Daniel Carlson kick), 8:29. Raiders 21–13. **Drive: 1 play, 30 yards, 0:07.**
- SEA – Tyler Lockett 35-yard pass from Geno Smith (Jason Myers kick), 5:21. Raiders 21–20. **Drive: 7 plays, 75 yards, 3:08.**
- LV – Daniel Carlson 36-yard field goal, 0:10. Raiders 24–20. **Drive: 13 plays, 57 yards, 5:11.**

**Third quarter**

- SEA – Kenneth Walker III 14-yard run (Jason Myers kick), 11:46. Seahawks 27–24. **Drive: 7 plays, 75 yards, 3:14.**
- LV – Daniel Carlson 25-yard field goal, 5:03. Tied 27–27. **Drive: 11 plays, 68 yards, 6:43.**

**Fourth quarter**

- SEA – Travis Homer 18-yard pass from Geno Smith (Jason Myers kick), 5:37. Seahawks 34–27. **Drive: 7 plays, 47 yards, 3:18.**
- LV – Foster Moreau 5-yard pass from Derek Carr (Daniel Carlson kick), 1:54. Tied 34–34. **Drive: 10 plays, 75 yards, 3:43.**

**Overtime**

- LV – Josh Jacobs 86-yard run, 4:20. Raiders 40–34. **Drive: 1 play, 86 yards, 0:12.**

**Top passers**

- LV – Derek Carr – 25/36, 295 yards, 3 TD, 2 INT
- SEA – Geno Smith – 27/37, 328 yards, 2 TD, INT

**Top rushers**

- LV – Josh Jacobs – 33 rushes, 229 yards, 2 TD
- SEA – Kenneth Walker III – 14 rushes, 26 yards, 2 TD

**Top receivers**

- LV – Davante Adams – 7 receptions, 74 yards
- SEA – DK Metcalf – 11 receptions, 90 yards

After a comeback win over Russell Wilson's current team, the Broncos, the Las Vegas Raiders travelled to Lumen Field to play his former team, the Seattle Seahawks. Las Vegas began the game very poorly, with Derek Carr already getting intercepted on only the first play. This set up a 12-yard touchdown run by Kenneth Walker, giving the Seahawks a 7-0 lead in the first 28 seconds. Just over 5 minutes later, Carr hit Ameer Abdullah with an 18-yard touchdown pass to tie the game at 7. However, on the Raiders' 3rd drive, he would throw another interception, which the Seahawks took a 10-7 lead off of by virtue of a 24-yard field goal from Jason Myers as the first quarter ended. From that point on, Derek Carr and the Raiders would shape up.

In the second quarter, Jason Meyers kicked a 34-yard field goal to bring the Seahawks' lead up to 13-7. Carr hit Mack Hollins with a 36-yard touchdown pass to swipe the Seahawks' lead and put the Raiders up, 14-13. After an interception by Geno Smith, Josh Jacobs ran for a 30-yard touchdown to bring the Raiders' lead up to 21-13. The Seahawks came within one point when Smith hit Tyler Lockett with a 35-yard touchdown pass. At the half, a 36-yard field goal from Daniel Carlson brought the Raiders' lead up to four points.

In the third quarter, Kenneth Walker would run in a second touchdown from 14 yards out to swipe the lead from the Raiders and put the Seahawks up, 27-24, and then, by virtue of Daniel Carlson kicking a 25-yard field goal, the Raiders tied the game at 27.

In the fourth quarter, Geno Smith would keep on shining, hitting Travis Homer with an 18-yard touchdown pass, putting the Seahawks up 34-27 with 5:37 left in regulation. However, the Raiders once again tied the game, this time, at 34, when Derek Carr hit Foster Moreau with a 5-yard touchdown pass. With neither team doing anything for the last 1:54 in regulation, it was time for overtime.

40 seconds into overtime, Josh Jacobs ripped off a walk-off 86-yard touchdown run to put the Raiders up, 40-34, drawing the game to a close and giving the Raiders their first win in Seattle since 1998, when they were based in Oakland, and the Seahawks were division mates with the Raiders.

With the upset win, the Raiders improved to 4-7. Josh Jacobs ran for 229 yards on 33 attempts for 2 touchdowns, including the touchdown that won the game for the Raiders, and averaged 6.9 yards per carry.

==== Week 13: vs. Los Angeles Chargers ====
Week 13: Los Angeles Chargers at Las Vegas Raiders – Game summary

Quarter	1	2	3	4	Total
Chargers	7	6	0	7	**20**
**Raiders**	0	10	14	3	**27**

at Allegiant Stadium, Paradise, Nevada

- Date: December 4
- Game time: 1:25 p.m. PST
- Game weather: None (indoor stadium)
- Game attendance: 62,123
- Referee: Craig Wrolstad
- TV announcers (CBS): Greg Gumbel, Adam Archuleta and AJ Ross
- Recap, Game Book

Game information

**First quarter**

- LAC – Bryce Callahan 26-yard interception return (Cameron Dicker kick), 5:07. Chargers 7–0.

**Second quarter**

- LAC – Cameron Dicker 37-yard field goal, 11:37. Chargers 10–0. **Drive: 13 plays, 61 yards, 6:35.**
- LV – Josh Jacobs 20-yard run (Daniel Carlson kick), 7:52. Chargers 10–7. **Drive: 8 plays, 75 yards, 3:45.**
- LV – Daniel Carlson 55-yard field goal, 2:17. Tied 10–10. **Drive: 8 play, 42 yards, 3:22.**
- LAC – Cameron Dicker 34-yard field goal, 0:27. Chargers 13–10. **Drive: 12 plays, 59 yards, 1:50.**

**Third quarter**

- LV – Davante Adams 31-yard pass from Derek Carr (Daniel Carlson kick), 14:28. Raiders 17–13. **Drive: 1 plays, 31 yards, 0:08.**
- LV – Davante Adams 45-yard pass from Derek Carr (Daniel Carlson kick), 10:53. Raiders 24–13. **Drive: 2 plays, 58 yards, 0:32.**

**Fourth quarter**

- LV – Daniel Carlson 25-yard field goal, 14:49. Raiders 27–13. **Drive: 14 play, 74 yards, 8:40.**
- LAC – Keenan Allen 35-yard pass from Justin Herbert (Cameron Dicker kick), 8:34. Raiders 27–20. **Drive: 12 play, 78 yards, 6:15.**

**Top passers**

- LAC – Justin Herbert – 28/47, 335 yards, TD
- LV – Derek Carr – 16/30, 250 yards, 2 TD, INT

**Top rushers**

- LAC – Austin Ekeler – 10 rushes, 35 yards
- LV – Josh Jacobs – 26 rushes, 144 yards, TD

**Top receivers**

- LAC – Keenan Allen – 6 receptions, 88 yards, TD
- LV – Davante Adams – 8 receptions, 177 yards, 2 TD

After a chilling overtime win against the Seahawks, the Raiders returned home for a rematch with one of their AFC West rivals, the Los Angeles Chargers. Las Vegas would overcome their second 10-point deficit in three games. Just like the previous game, Las Vegas began the game very poorly, with Bryce Callahan returning a Derek Carr interception for a score not even 10 minutes into the game, giving the Chargers a 7-0 lead.

In the second quarter, the game worsened for the Raiders when Cameron Dicker booted a 37-yard field goal to put them in a 10-0 hole. Josh Jacobs, though, would trim the Raiders' deficit to three points with a 20-yard touchdown run, and would eventually be accompanied by a 55-yard field goal from Daniel Carlson to tie the game at 10, only for the Chargers to break the tie with a 34-yard field goal by Cameron Dicker, putting them up, 13-10 at the half.

Things significantly turned around for the Raiders in the second half, largely due to Derek Carr hitting Davante Adams with two consecutive touchdown passes in the third quarter, from 31 yards and 45 yards, respectively, and putting the Raiders up, 24-13. They kept Justin Herbert in check, allowing the Bolts to score only six points on the first eight drives.

In the fourth quarter, a 25-yard field goal from Daniel Carlson brought the Raiders' lead to 27-13. Herbert hit Keenan Allen with a 35-yard touchdown pass on 4th down to make it a 27-20 game with 8:34 left, which would end up being the final score. Just as the Chargers appeared likely to come back to life, since they got the ball to Las Vegas' side of the field, they could not do anything, as their final drive ended on a turnover on downs.

With the upset win, the Raiders improved to 5–7. Davante Adams caught 8 passes for 177 yards and 2 touchdowns in the win.

==== Week 14: at Los Angeles Rams ====
Week 14: Las Vegas Raiders at Los Angeles Rams – Game summary

Quarter	1	2	3	4	Total
Raiders	10	3	0	3	**16**
**Rams**	3	0	0	14	**17**

at SoFi Stadium, Inglewood, California

- Date: December 8
- Game time: 5:15 p.m. PST
- Game weather: Clear, 57 °F (14 °C)
- Game attendance: 74,738
- Referee: Brad Rogers
- TV announcers (KNTV/Prime Video): Al Michaels, Kirk Herbstreit and Kaylee Hartung
- Recap, Game Book

Game information

**First quarter**

- LV – Josh Jacobs 1-yard run (Daniel Carlson kick), 9:13. Raiders 7–0. **Drive: 12 plays, 75 yards, 5:47.**
- LV – Daniel Carlson 52-yard field goal, 2:22. Raiders 10–0. **Drive: 8 play, 46 yards, 4:41.**
- LAR – Matt Gay 55-yard field goal, 0:06. Raiders 10–3. **Drive: 5 play, 29 yards, 2:16.**

**Second quarter**

- LV – Daniel Carlson 31-yard field goal, 9:40. Raiders 13–3. **Drive: 10 play, 56 yards, 5:26.**

**Third quarter**

- No scoring plays.

**Fourth quarter**

- LV – Daniel Carlson 36-yard field goal, 12:20. Raiders 16–3. **Drive: 11 play, 31 yards, 5:22.**
- LAR – Cam Akers 1-yard run (Matt Gay kick), 3:19. Raiders 16–10. **Drive: 17 play, 75 yards, 9:01.**
- LAR – Van Jefferson 23-yard pass from Baker Mayfield (Matt Gay kick), 0:10. Rams 17–16. **Drive: 8 play, 98 yards, 1:35.**

**Top passers**

- LV – Derek Carr – 11/20, 137 yards, 2 INT
- LAR – Baker Mayfield – 22/35, 230 yards, TD

**Top rushers**

- LV – Josh Jacobs – 27 rushes, 99 yards, TD
- LAR – Cam Akers – 12 rushes, 42 yards, TD

**Top receivers**

- LV – Davante Adams – 3 receptions, 71 yards
- LAR – Ben Skowronek – 7 receptions, 89 yards

==== Week 15: vs. New England Patriots ====
Week 15: New England Patriots at Las Vegas Raiders – Game summary

Quarter	1	2	3	4	Total
Patriots	0	3	10	11	**24**
**Raiders**	3	14	0	13	**30**

at Allegiant Stadium, Paradise, Nevada

- Date: December 18
- Game time: 1:05 p.m. PST
- Game weather: None (indoor stadium)
- Game attendance: 62,273
- Referee: Ronald Torbert
- TV announcers (Fox): Kenny Albert, Jonathan Vilma and Shannon Spake
- Recap, Game Book

Game information

**First quarter**

- LV – Daniel Carlson 49-yard field goal, 8:26. Raiders 3–0. **Drive: 12 plays, 42 yards, 6:34.**

**Second quarter**

- NE – Nick Folk 24-yard field goal, 11:51. Tied 3–3. **Drive: 14 play, 82 yards, 7:19.**
- LV – Darren Waller 25-yard pass from Derek Carr (Daniel Carlson kick), 5:18. Raiders 10–3. **Drive: 11 plays, 76 yards, 6:33.**
- LV – Mack Hollins 5-yard pass from Derek Carr (Daniel Carlson kick), 0:04. Raiders 17–3. **Drive: 2 plays, 20 yards, 0:23.**

**Third quarter**

- NE – Kyle Dugger 16-yard interception return (Nick Folk kick), 12:07. Raiders 17–10.
- NE – Nick Folk 47-yard field goal, 1:21. Raiders 17–13. **Drive: 12 play, 69 yards, 6:33.**

**Fourth quarter**

- NE – Nick Folk 54-yard field goal, 12:52. Raiders 17–16. **Drive: 7 play, 15 yards, 1:57.**
- NE – Rhamondre Stevenson 34-yard run (Mac Jones pass to Jakobi Meyers), 3:43. Patriots 24–17. **Drive: 3 play, 76 yards, 1:27.**
- LV – Keelan Cole 30-yard pass from Derek Carr (Daniel Carlson kick), 0:32. Tied 24–24. **Drive: 9 plays, 81 yards, 1:39.**
- LV – Chandler Jones 48-yard fumble return, 0:00. Raiders 30–24.

**Top passers**

- NE – Mac Jones – 13/31, 112 yards
- LV – Derek Carr – 20/38, 231 yards, 3 TD, INT

**Top rushers**

- NE – Rhamondre Stevenson – 19 rushes, 172 yards, TD
- LV – Josh Jacobs – 22 rushes, 93 yards

**Top receivers**

- NE – Jakobi Meyers – 2 receptions, 47 yards
- LV – Keelan Cole – 2 receptions, 50 yards, TD

Despite almost squandering a 17–3 lead, the Raiders tied the game at 24 with a late controversial touchdown pass from Derek Carr to Keelan Cole, then won due to a bizarre blunder at the end of regulation by the Patriots. As New England quarterback Mac Jones handed the ball off to running back Rhamondre Stevenson, presumably to run out the clock and force overtime, Stevenson picked up 23 yards from the New England 44-yard-line to the Las Vegas 32-yard-line as the Raiders were in prevent defense. With Raiders safety Duron Harmon closing in, Stevenson pitched the ball to Patriots receiver Jakobi Meyers, who ran back to the 40-yard-line before throwing the ball back towards Mac Jones' vicinity, unaware that Raiders defensive end Chandler Jones was guarding him. The latter intercepted the ball and stiff-armed the former to the ground before running the ball back to the New England endzone for the Raiders' improbable game-winning touchdown, which was later nicknamed the "Vagary in Vegas" by NFL.com, "Col-lateral damage" by the Lowell Sun, and the "Lunatic Lateral" by Sports Illustrated.

With the win, the Raiders defeated the Patriots for the first time since 2002, when the team was based in Oakland, and improved to 6–8.

==== Week 16: at Pittsburgh Steelers ====
Week 16: Las Vegas Raiders at Pittsburgh Steelers – Game summary

Quarter	1	2	3	4	Total
Raiders	7	3	0	0	**10**
**Steelers**	0	3	0	10	**13**

at Acrisure Stadium, Pittsburgh, Pennsylvania

- Date: December 24
- Game time: 8:15 p.m. EST/5:15 p.m. PST
- Game weather: Cold, 8 °F (−13 °C)
- Game attendance: 64,761
- Referee: Tra Blake
- TV announcers (NFLN): Rich Eisen, Kurt Warner, Steve Mariucci, Michael Irvin, Allison Williams, and Steve Wyche
- Recap, Game Book

Game information

**First quarter**

- LV – Hunter Renfrow 14-yard pass from Derek Carr (Daniel Carlson kick), 6:38. Raiders 7–0. **Drive: 14 plays, 72 yards, 8:22.**

**Second quarter**

- PIT – Chris Boswell 44-yard field goal, 1:49. Raiders 7–3. **Drive: 15 plays, 62 yards, 8:22.**
- LV – Daniel Carlson 40-yard field goal, 0:05. Raiders 10–3. **Drive: 9 plays, 53 yards, 1:44.**

**Third quarter**

- No scoring plays.

**Fourth quarter**

- PIT – Chris Boswell 40-yard field goal, 9:47. Raiders 10–6. **Drive: 9 plays, 33 yards, 5:07.**
- PIT – George Pickens 14-yard pass from Kenny Pickett (Chris Boswell kick), 0:46. Steelers 13–10. **Drive: 10 plays, 76 yards, 2:09.**

**Top passers**

- LV – Derek Carr – 16/30, 174 yards, TD, 3 INT
- PIT – Kenny Pickett – 26/39, 244 yards, TD, INT

**Top rushers**

- LV – Josh Jacobs – 15 rushes, 44 yards
- PIT – Najee Harris – 16 rushes, 53 yards

**Top receivers**

- LV – Darren Waller – 4 receptions, 58 yards
- PIT – Pat Freiermuth – 7 receptions, 66 yards

After a bizarre win over the New England Patriots, the Las Vegas Raiders travelled to Acrisure Stadium on Christmas Eve to face one of their longtime rivals, the Pittsburgh Steelers. This game was meant to celebrate the 50th anniversary of the Immaculate Reception, one of the most famous plays in American football, where the Steelers beat the then-Oakland Raiders in the 1972 playoffs.

The Raiders drew first blood, with Derek Carr hitting Hunter Renfrow with a 14-yard touchdown pass to take a 7-0 lead. The Steelers would try a 43-yard field goal and failed; the Raiders scored the only points of the first quarter.

In the second quarter, Chris Boswell booted a 44-yard field goal to trim the Raiders' lead to four points. However, Vegas pushed their lead back up to seven points with a 40-yard field goal from Daniel Carlson.

In the second half, though, things took a turn in the wrong direction for Vegas, with Derek Carr getting intercepted on two consecutive drives. After the first interception, the Steelers tried a field goal from 52 yards and missed it. No points were scored in the third quarter.

However, just as the Raiders appeared likely to give the Steelers their first losing season in 19 years, it was all Steelers in the fourth quarter, as they scored the final 10 points. Chris Boswell booted a 40-yard field goal to trim the Raiders' lead to 4 points. Kenny Pickett would then hit George Pickens with a 14-yard touchdown pass with less than a minute left to reach the final score of 13–10 in favor of Pittsburgh.

Derek Carr tried to resuscitate the Raiders with less than 40 seconds left and could not succeed at that; he got intercepted, and his time in Las Vegas came to an end.

With the loss, the Raiders fell to 6–9, and were sent to their first losing season since 2019 when they were based in Oakland.

Darren Waller caught 4 passes for 58 yards in the loss.

==== Week 17: vs. San Francisco 49ers ====
Week 17: San Francisco 49ers at Las Vegas Raiders – Game summary

Quarter	1	2	3	4	OT	Total
**49ers**	7	7	7	13	3	**37**
Raiders	10	7	7	10	0	**34**

at Allegiant Stadium, Paradise, Nevada

- Date: January 1
- Game time: 1:05 p.m. PST
- Game weather: None (indoor stadium)
- Game attendance: 62,367
- Referee: Clay Martin
- TV announcers (Fox): Kevin Kugler, Mark Sanchez and Laura Okmin
- Recap, Game Book

Game information

**First quarter**

- LV – Darren Waller 24-yard pass from Jarrett Stidham (Daniel Carlson kick), 11:40. Raiders 7–0. **Drive: 6 plays, 70 yards, 3:20.**
- SF – Brandon Aiyuk 2-yard pass from Brock Purdy (Robbie Gould kick), 7:06. Tied 7–7. **Drive: 8 plays, 67 yards, 4:34.**
- LV – Daniel Carlson 20-yard field goal, 1:45. Raiders 10–7. **Drive: 10 plays, 74 yards, 5:21.**

**Second quarter**

- SF – George Kittle 2-yard pass from Brock Purdy (Robbie Gould kick), 9:38. 49ers 14–10. **Drive: 13 plays, 75 yards, 7:07.**
- LV – Davante Adams 4-yard pass from Jarrett Stidham (Daniel Carlson kick), 0:10. Raiders 17–14. **Drive: 8 plays, 44 yards, 2:23.**

**Third quarter**

- LV – Davante Adams 60-yard pass from Jarrett Stidham (Daniel Carlson kick), 10:22. Raiders 24–14. **Drive: 6 plays, 84 yards, 2:54.**
- SF – Christian McCaffrey 14-yard run (Robbie Gould kick), 5:22. Raiders 24–21. **Drive: 8 plays, 75 yards, 5:00.**

**Fourth quarter**

- SF – Robbie Gould 43-yard field goal, 12:34. Tied 24–24. **Drive: 6 plays, 17 yards, 2:12.**
- SF – Robbie Gould 24-yard field goal, 6:44. 49ers 27–24. **Drive: 7 plays, 59 yards, 2:58.**
- LV – Daniel Carlson 57-yard field goal, 4:08. Tied 27–27. **Drive: 7 plays, 36 yards, 2:36.**
- SF – Jordan Mason 14-yard run (Robbie Gould kick), 2:17. 49ers 34–27. **Drive: 5 plays, 75 yards, 1:51.**
- LV – Josh Jacobs 1-yard run (Daniel Carlson kick), 1:11. Tied 34–34. **Drive: 3 plays, 75 yards, 1:06.**

**Overtime**

- SF – Robbie Gould 23-yard field goal, 6:53. Tied 37–34. **Drive: 2 plays, -2 yards, 0:46.**

**Top passers**

- SF – Brock Purdy – 22/35, 284 yards, 2 TD, INT
- LV – Jarrett Stidham – 23/34, 365 yards, 3 TD, 2 INT

**Top rushers**

- SF – Christian McCaffrey – 19 rushes, 121 yards, TD
- LV – Josh Jacobs – 17 rush, 69 yards, TD

**Top receivers**

- SF – Brandon Aiyuk – 9 receptions, 101 yards, TD
- LV – Davante Adams – 7 receptions, 153 yards, 2 TD

==== Week 18: vs. Kansas City Chiefs ====
Week 18: Kansas City Chiefs at Las Vegas Raiders – Game summary

Quarter	1	2	3	4	Total
**Chiefs**	7	17	0	7	**31**
Raiders	3	0	3	7	**13**

at Allegiant Stadium, Paradise, Nevada

- Date: January 7
- Game time: 1:30 p.m. PST
- Game weather: None (indoor stadium)
- Game attendance: 62,136
- Referee: Scott Novak
- TV announcers (ESPN/ABC): Steve Levy, Louis Riddick, Dan Orlovsky and Laura Rutledge
- Recap, Game Book

Game information

**First quarter**

- KC – Jerick McKinnon 2-yard pass from Patrick Mahomes (Harrison Butker kick), 12:52. Chiefs 7–0. **Drive: 5 plays, 75 yards, 2:08.**
- LV – Daniel Carlson 54-yard field goal, 7:15. Chiefs 7–3. **Drive: 10 plays, 40 yards, 5:37.**

**Second quarter**

- KC – Ronald Jones II 2-yard run (Harrison Butker kick), 14:56. Chiefs 14–3. **Drive: 3 plays, 44 yards, 1:08.**
- KC – Kadarius Toney 11-yard run (Harrison Butker kick), 0:47. Chiefs 21–3. **Drive: 12 plays, 98 yards, 5:19.**
- KC – Harrison Butker 44-yard field goal, 0:00. Chiefs 24–3. **Drive: 2 plays, 4 yards, 0:09.**

**Third quarter**

- LV – Daniel Carlson 38-yard field goal, 6:55. Chiefs 24–6. **Drive: 13 plays, 55 yards, 8:06.**

**Fourth quarter**

- KC – Isiah Pacheco 1-yard run (Harrison Butker kick), 11:03. Chiefs 31–6. **Drive: 7 plays, 62 yards, 3:01.**
- LV – Hunter Renfrow 11-yard pass from Jarrett Stidham (Daniel Carlson kick), 6:37. Chiefs 31–13. **Drive: 10 plays, 75 yards, 4:26.**

**Top passers**

- KC – Patrick Mahomes – 18/26, 202 yards, TD
- LV – Jarrett Stidham – 22/36, 219 yards, TD, INT

**Top rushers**

- KC – Isiah Pacheco – 8 rushes, 64 yards, TD
- LV – Jarrett Stidham – 7 rushes, 50 yards

**Top receivers**

- KC – Justin Watson – 1 reception, 67 yards
- LV – Davante Adams – 5 receptions, 73 yards

=== Standings ===
==== Division ====
AFC West
	W	L	T	PCT	DIV	CONF	PF	PA	STK
^{(1)} Kansas City Chiefs	14	3	0	.824	6–0	9–3	496	369	W5
^{(5)} Los Angeles Chargers	10	7	0	.588	2–4	7–5	391	384	L1
Las Vegas Raiders	6	11	0	.353	3–3	5–7	395	418	L3
Denver Broncos	5	12	0	.294	1–5	3–9	287	359	W1

==== Conference ====
AFC
#	Team	Division	W	L	T	PCT	DIV	CONF	SOS	SOV	STK
**Division leaders**
1	Kansas City Chiefs	West	14	3	0	.824	6–0	9–3	.453	.422	W5
2	Buffalo Bills	East	13	3	0	.813	4–2	9–2	.489	.471	W7
3	Cincinnati Bengals	North	12	4	0	.750	3–3	8–3	.507	.490	W8
4	Jacksonville Jaguars	South	9	8	0	.529	4–2	8–4	.467	.438	W5
**Wild cards**
5 (Note: LA Chargers claimed the No. 5 seed over Baltimore based on conference record (7–5 vs. 6–6).)	Los Angeles Chargers	West	10	7	0	.588	2–4	7–5	.443	.341	L1
6	Baltimore Ravens	North	10	7	0	.588	3–3	6–6	.509	.456	L2
7 (Note: Miami finished ahead of Pittsburgh based on head-to-head victory, claiming the 7th and final playoff spot.)	Miami Dolphins	East	9	8	0	.529	3–3	7–5	.537	.457	W1
**Did not qualify for the postseason**
8	Pittsburgh Steelers	North	9	8	0	.529	3–3	5–7	.519	.451	W4
9	New England Patriots	East	8	9	0	.471	3–3	6–6	.502	.415	L1
10 (Note: NY Jets and Tennessee finished ahead of Cleveland based on conference record (5–7 vs. 4–8).) (Note: NY Jets finished ahead of Tennessee based on common record (3–3 vs. 2–4 against: Buffalo, Cincinnati, Denver, Green Bay, Jacksonville).)	New York Jets	East	7	10	0	.412	2–4	5–7	.538	.458	L6
11	Tennessee Titans	South	7	10	0	.412	3–3	5–7	.509	.336	L7
12	Cleveland Browns	North	7	10	0	.412	3–3	4–8	.524	.492	L1
13	Las Vegas Raiders	West	6	11	0	.353	3–3	5–7	.474	.397	L3
14	Denver Broncos	West	5	12	0	.294	1–5	3–9	.481	.465	W1
15	Indianapolis Colts	South	4	12	1	.265	1–4–1	4–7–1	.512	.500	L7
16	Houston Texans	South	3	13	1	.206	3–2–1	3–8–1	.481	.402	W1
**Tiebreakers** (Note: When breaking ties for three or more teams under the NFL's rules, they are first broken within divisions, then comparing only the highest ranked remaining team from each division.)
