= Nate Hobbs =

American football player (born 1999)

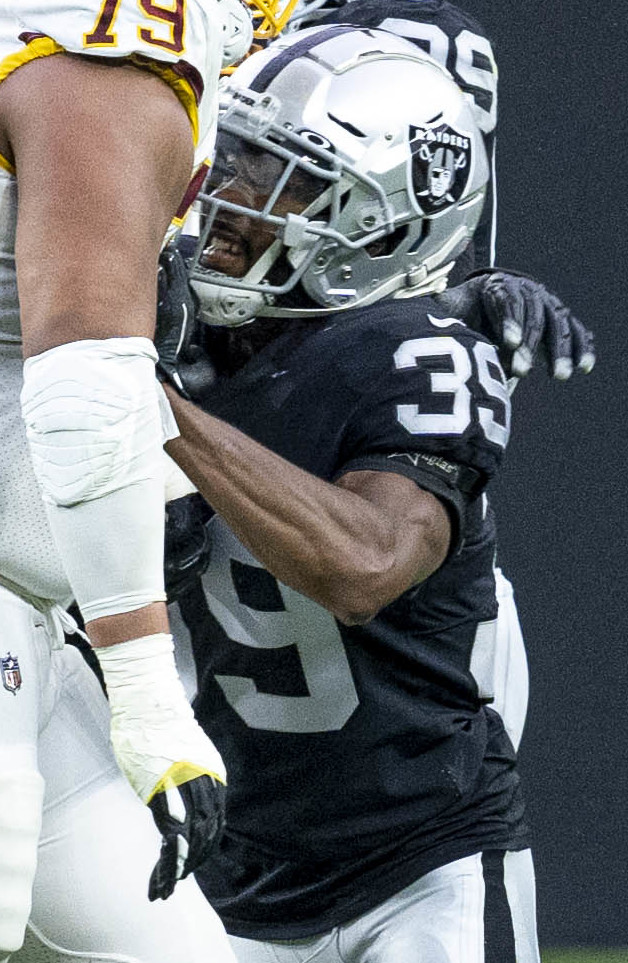
- Hobbs with the Las Vegas Raiders in 2021

No. 22 – San Francisco 49ers
- Position: Cornerback
- Roster status: Injured reserve

Personal information
- Born: June 24, 1999 (age 27); Louisville, Kentucky, U.S.
- Listed height: 6 ft 0 in (1.83 m)
- Listed weight: 195 lb (88 kg)

Career information
- High school: Louisville Male
- College: Illinois (2017–2020)
- NFL draft: 2021: 5th round, 167th overall pick

Career history
- Las Vegas Raiders (2021–2024); Green Bay Packers (2025); San Francisco 49ers (2026–present)

Awards and highlights
- PFF All-Rookie Team (2021)

Career NFL statistics as of 2025
- Total tackles: 308
- Sacks: 3
- Forced fumbles: 3
- Fumble recoveries: 1
- Pass deflections: 21
- Interceptions: 3
- Stats at Pro Football Reference

Nate Hobbs (born June 24, 1999) is an American professional football cornerback for the San Francisco 49ers of the National Football League (NFL). He played college football for the Illinois Fighting Illini and was selected by the Las Vegas Raiders in the fifth round of the 2021 NFL draft.

== College career ==
Hobbs was ranked as a three–star recruit by 247Sports.com coming out of high school. He committed to Illinois on December 23, 2016.

== Professional career ==
Pre-draft measurables
Height	Weight	Arm length	Hand span	Wingspan	40-yard dash	10-yard split	20-yard split	20-yard shuttle	Three-cone drill	Vertical jump	Broad jump	Bench press
5 ft 11 3/8 in (1.81 m)	196 lb (89 kg)	31 1/2 in (0.80 m)	9 1/2 in (0.24 m)	6 ft 4 1/2 in (1.94 m)	4.48 s	1.58 s	2.56 s	4.17 s	6.85 s	40.5 in (1.03 m)	11 ft 3 in (3.43 m)	17 reps
All values from Pro Day

=== Las Vegas Raiders ===
External videos
- Raiders draft Nate Hobbs No. 167

The Las Vegas Raiders selected in the fifth round (167th overall) of the 2021 NFL draft. The Raiders obtained the 167th pick as a result of trading guard Gabe Jackson to the Seattle Seahawks. He was the 24th cornerback drafted in 2021 and also became the first cornerback drafted from Illinois to play in the NFL since 2010. He notably became the first of five defensive backs drafted from the same Illinois' secondary spanning from 2018 to 2020. Fellow cornerback Kerby Joseph was selected in 2022 with Devon Witherspoon, Quan Martin, and Sydney Brown following Hobbs and Joseph in 2023.

==== 2021 ====
On May 17, 2021, the Las Vegas Raiders signed Hobbs to a four–year, $3.78 million contract that includes an initial signing bonus of $303,052.

Throughout training camp, he competed against Keisean Nixon and Amik Robertson to be a backup cornerback. Hobbs unexpectedly surpassed 2020 first–round pick Damon Arnette on the depth chart and was subsequently named as the third cornerback on the depth chart to begin the season, behind starting cornerbacks Casey Hayward and Trayvon Mullen.

On September 13, 2021, Hobbs started in his professional regular season debut and made two solo tackles in a 33–27 OT win against the Baltimore Ravens. In Week 6, he collected a season-high 11 combined tackles (six solo) during a 34–24 victory at the Denver Broncos. On December 5, 2021, Hobbs recorded nine combined tackles (four solo) and made his first career interception on a pass thrown by Taylor Heinicke to wide receiver Terry McLaurin in the Raiders' 15–17 loss against the Washington Football Team. On December 20, 2021, the Las Vegas Raiders placed Hobbs on the reserve/COVID-19 list. On December 25, 2021, the Las Vegas Raiders activated Hobbs from the reserve/COVID-19 list. He finished his rookie season with a total of 74 combined tackles (51 solo), three pass deflections, one sack, and one interception in 16 games and nine starts. He received an overall grade of 80.1 from Pro Football Focus and earned a coverage grade of 78.0.

The Las Vegas Raiders finished the 2021 NFL season second in the AFC West with a 10–7 record and clinched a Wildcard spot. On January 15, 2022, Hobbs started in his first career playoff game and recorded eight combined tackles (three solo) and one pass deflection during a 19–26 loss at the Cincinnati Bengals in the AFC Wildcard Game.

==== 2022 ====
On January 31, 2022, the Las Vegas Raiders hired former New England Patriots' offensive coordinator Josh McDaniels as their new head coach. The Raiders' new defensive coordinator Patrick Graham named Hobbs and Rock Ya-Sin as the starting cornerbacks to begin the season.

In Week 2, he collected a season-high 11 combined tackles (nine solo) during a 23–29 loss against the Arizona Cardinals. On October 10, 2022, Hobbs made nine combined tackles (six solo) before exiting in the third quarter of a 29–30 loss at the Kansas City Chiefs due to an injury. On October 17, 2022, the Las Vegas Raiders officially placed Hobbs on injured reserve after he suffered a broken hand. On December 3, 2022, the Las Vegas Raiders activated Hobbs from injured reserve after he missed six consecutive games (Weeks 6–12). He finished the 2022 NFL season with 72 combined tackles (57 solo), four pass deflections, a forced fumble, one fumble recovery, and one sack in 11 games and 11 starts. He received an overall grade of 60.9 from Pro Football Focus in 2022.

==== 2023 ====
He returned as the No. 1 starting cornerback in 2023 and was paired with Marcus Peters. On September 10, 2023, Hobbs started in the Las Vegas Raiders' season-opener at the Denver Broncos and collected a season-high 12 combined tackles (eight solo) during a 17–16 win. He was sidelined for four consecutive games (Weeks 4–7) after injuring his ankle. On October 31, 2023, the Las Vegas Raiders fired head coach Josh McDaniels after falling to a 3–5 record. Linebackers coach Antonio Pierce was appointed the interim head coach for the rest of the season. On November 5, 2023, he made seven combined tackles (three solo), a pass deflection, and intercepted a pass thrown by Tommy DeVito to wide receiver Darius Slayton as the Raiders defeated the New York Giants 30–6. He finished with 86 combined tackles (59 solo), seven pass deflections, one interception, and one sack in 13 games and 11 starts. His overall grade for 2023 was 69.0 according to Pro Football Focus.

==== 2024 ====
The Las Vegas Raiders' new head coach Antonio Pierce retained Hobbs as the No. 1 starting cornerback and paired him with Jack Jones. In Week 6, he collected a season-high ten combined tackles (four solo) during a 13–32 loss against the Pittsburgh Steelers. On October 20, 2024, Hobbs recorded six solo tackles, one pass deflection, and intercepted a pass thrown by Matthew Stafford to wide receiver Tutu Atwell as the Raiders lost 15–20 at the Los Angeles Rams. In Week 9, he injured his ankle during a loss at the Cincinnati Bengals and subsequently missed the next four games (Weeks 11–14). He finished the 2024 NFL season with a total of 49 combined tackles (33 solo), five pass deflections, and one interception in 11 games and seven starts.

=== Green Bay Packers ===
==== 2025 ====
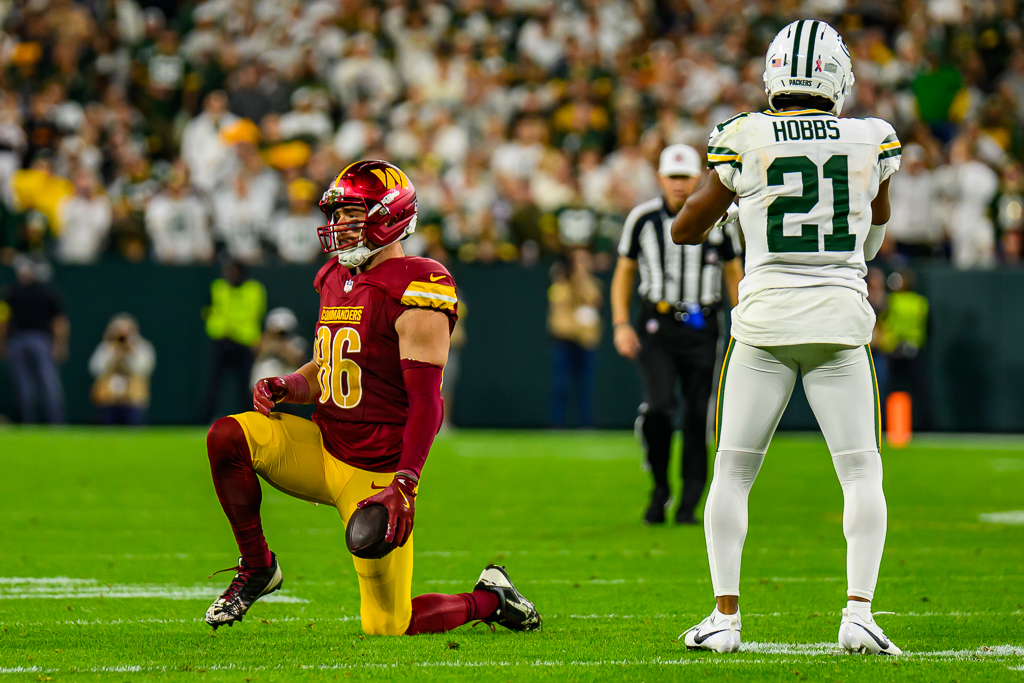
Hobbs (#21) during a game against the Washington Commanders in 2025

On March 13, 2025, Hobbs signed a four-year, $48 million contract with the Green Bay Packers. He made 11 appearances (five starts) for Green Bay, recording two pass deflections and 27 combined tackles. On December 31, the Packers placed him on season-ending injured reserve due to a knee injury suffered in Week 17 against the Baltimore Ravens.

On March 11, 2026, Hobbs was released by the Packers.

=== San Francisco 49ers ===
==== 2026 ====
On March 16, 2026, Hobbs signed a one-year, $4.5 million contract with the San Francisco 49ers. He was placed on injured reserve on September 1 due to a groin injury.

== NFL career statistics ==
Legend
**Bold**	Career high

=== Regular season ===
Year	Team	Games		Tackles				Interceptions						Fumbles			
Year	Team	GP	GS	Cmb	Solo	Ast	Sck	Int	Yds	Avg	Lng	TD	PD	FF	FR	Yds	TD
2021	LV	**16**	9	74	51	23	1.0	1	9	9.0	9	0	3	1	0	0	0
2022	LV	11	11	72	57	15	1.0	0	0	0.0	0	0	4	1	**1**	**7**	0
2023	LV	13	11	**86**	**59**	**27**	1.0	1	10	10.0	10	0	**7**	1	0	0	0
2024	LV	11	7	49	33	16	0.0	1	**35**	**35.0**	**35**	0	5	0	0	0	0
2025	GB	11	5	27	14	13	0.0	0	0	0.0	0	0	2	0	0	0	0
Career		62	43	308	214	94	3.0	3	54	18.0	35	0	21	3	1	7	0
Source: pro-football-reference.com

=== Postseason ===
Year	Team	Games		Tackles				Interceptions						Fumbles			
Year	Team	GP	GS	Cmb	Solo	Ast	Sck	Int	Yds	Avg	Lng	TD	PD	FF	FR	Yds	TD
2021	LV	1	0	8	3	5	0.0	0	0	0.0	0	0	1	0	0	0	0
Career		1	0	8	3	5	0.0	0	0	0.0	0	0	1	0	0	0	0
Source: pro-football-reference.com

== Personal life ==
On the morning of January 3, 2022, Hobbs was arrested for driving under the influence. He was found by the police asleep at the wheel of his car on a parking lot exit ramp.
