= Bryce Cosby =

American gridiron football player (born 1999)

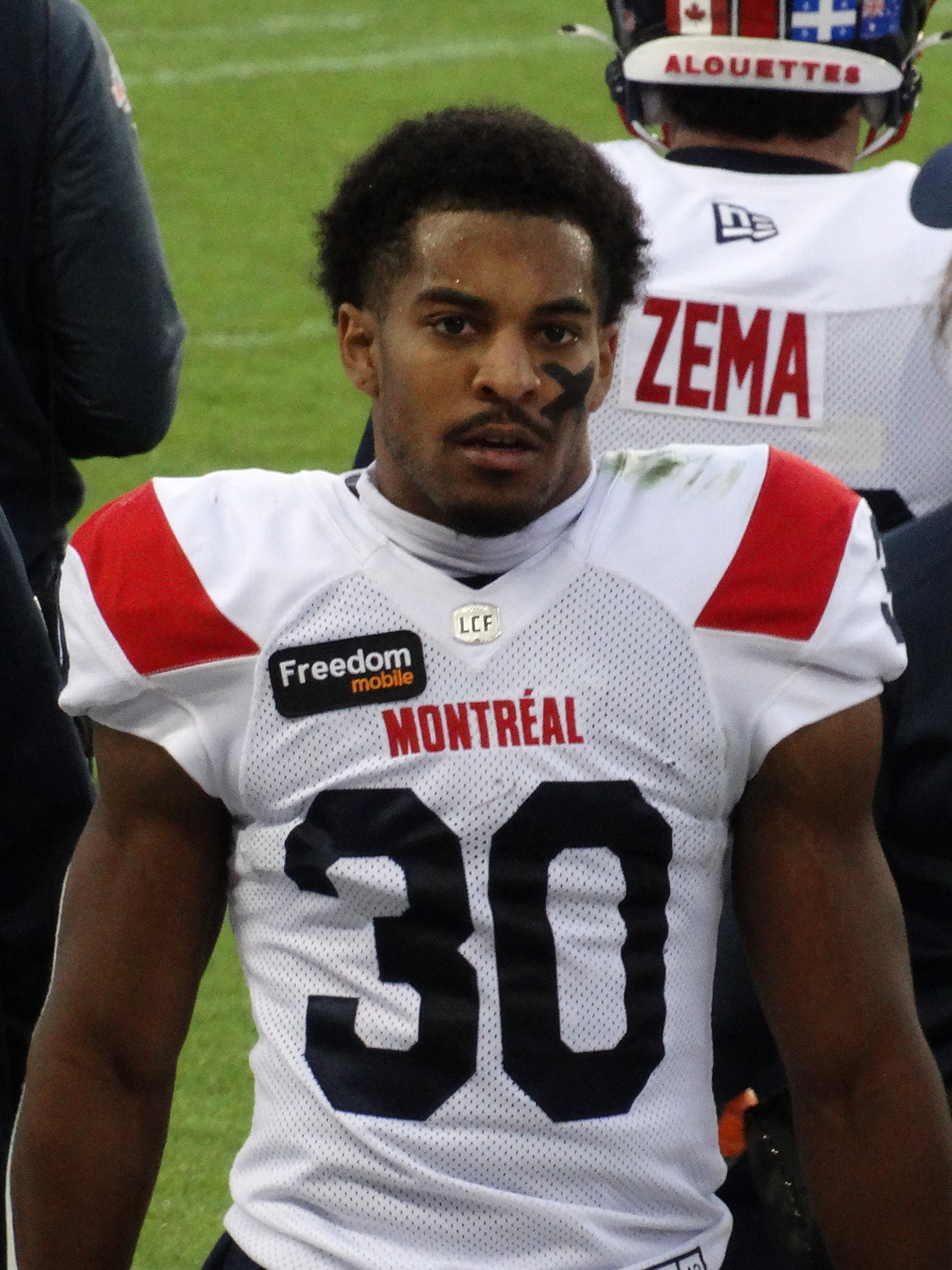
- Cosby with the Montreal Alouettes in 2024

Profile
- Position: Defensive back

Personal information
- Born: March 22, 1999 (age 27); Louisville, Kentucky, U.S.
- Listed height: 5 ft 10 in (1.78 m)
- Listed weight: 188 lb (85 kg)

Career information
- High school: DuPont Manual (Louisville)
- College: Ball State (2017–2021)
- NFL draft: 2022: undrafted

Career history
- Las Vegas Raiders (2022–2023)*; Montreal Alouettes (2024); Edmonton Elks (2025)
- * Offseason or practice squad member only

Awards and highlights
- First-team All-MAC (2020); Arizona Bowl Defensive MVP (2020)
- Stats at Pro Football Reference
- Stats at CFL.ca

Bryce Edward Cosby (born March 22, 1999) is an American professional football defensive back. He played college football for the Ball State Cardinals. He has been a member of the Las Vegas Raiders of the National Football League (NFL), and the Montreal Alouettes and Edmonton Elks of the Canadian Football League (CFL).

== College career ==
Cosby, originally from Louisville, Kentucky, began playing football as a defensive back and wide receiver at the local DuPont Manual High School, where he was captain and stood out as one of the best players in the category.

In 2017, Cosby committed to play college football at Ball State University and went to play for the Cardinals. Already from the first year and throughout his experience with the Cardinals Cosby played as a starter, covering the role of safety, only entering as a reserve in the first game of 2018 due to an injury suffered during the pre-season training period. In 2020, he was named among the best players in the conference (First Team All-MAC). Overall in five years with the Cardinals, he played 56 games, of which 55 as a starter, collecting 380 tackles, of which 280 solo, 10 interceptions, 5.0 sacks and three forced fumbles.

On December 29, 2021, Cosby declared himself eligible for the 2022 NFL draft.

=== College statistics ===
Year	Team	Games		Defense							
Year	Team	GP	GS	Int	Yds	Avg	TD	Solo	Ast	Tot	Sac
2017	Ball State	**12**	**12**	**2**	0	0.00	0	35	24	59	0.0
2018	Ball State	**12**	11	**2**	0	0.00	0	42	**41**	83	0.0
2019	Ball State	**12**	**12**	**2**	0	0.00	0	49	29	78	0.0
2020	Ball State	8	8	**2**	-4	-2.00	0	35	27	62	1.0
2021	Ball State	**12**	**12**	**2**	0	0.00	0	**59**	39	**98**	**4.0**
Career		56	55	10	-4	-0.40	0	220	160	380	5.0

Career personal bests are in bold

== Professional career ==
Pre-draft measurables
Height	Weight	Arm length	Hand span	40-yard dash	10-yard split	20-yard split	20-yard shuttle	Three-cone drill	Vertical jump	Broad jump	Bench press
5 ft 9 3/5 in (1.77 m)	188 lb (85 kg)	30 1/2 in (0.77 m)	9 in (0.23 m)	4.65 s	1.54 s	2.56 s	4.25 s	7.00 s	39 in (0.99 m)	10 ft 4 in (3.15 m)	10 reps
All values from Pro Day

=== Las Vegas Raiders ===
Cosby was not selected in the 2022 NFL draft and on May 12, 2022, signed a one-year, $207,000 contract with the Las Vegas Raiders as an undrafted free agent.

On August 30, 2022, Cosby did not return to the active roster and was released by the Raiders, only to sign with the practice squad the following day. On October 17, 2022, he was released, and then reinstated to the practice squad on October 26, 2022, where he remained for the entire season.

On January 9, 2023, he signed a reserve/future contract with the Raiders. He was released on August 27, 2023.

=== Montreal Alouettes ===
On January 29, 2024, Cosby signed to play for the Montreal Alouettes of the Canadian Football League (CFL). He played in all 18 regular season games where he had 55 defensive tackles, 12 special teams tackles, one sack, and two interceptions. He was with the team in training camp in 2025, but was part of the final cuts on May 31, 2025.

=== Edmonton Elks ===
The Edmonton Elks announced on July 20, 2025, that they had signed Cosby to their practice roster. He was promoted to the active roster on July 23, and moved back to the practice roster on July 31, 2025.
