= Marcus Peters =

American football player (born 1993)

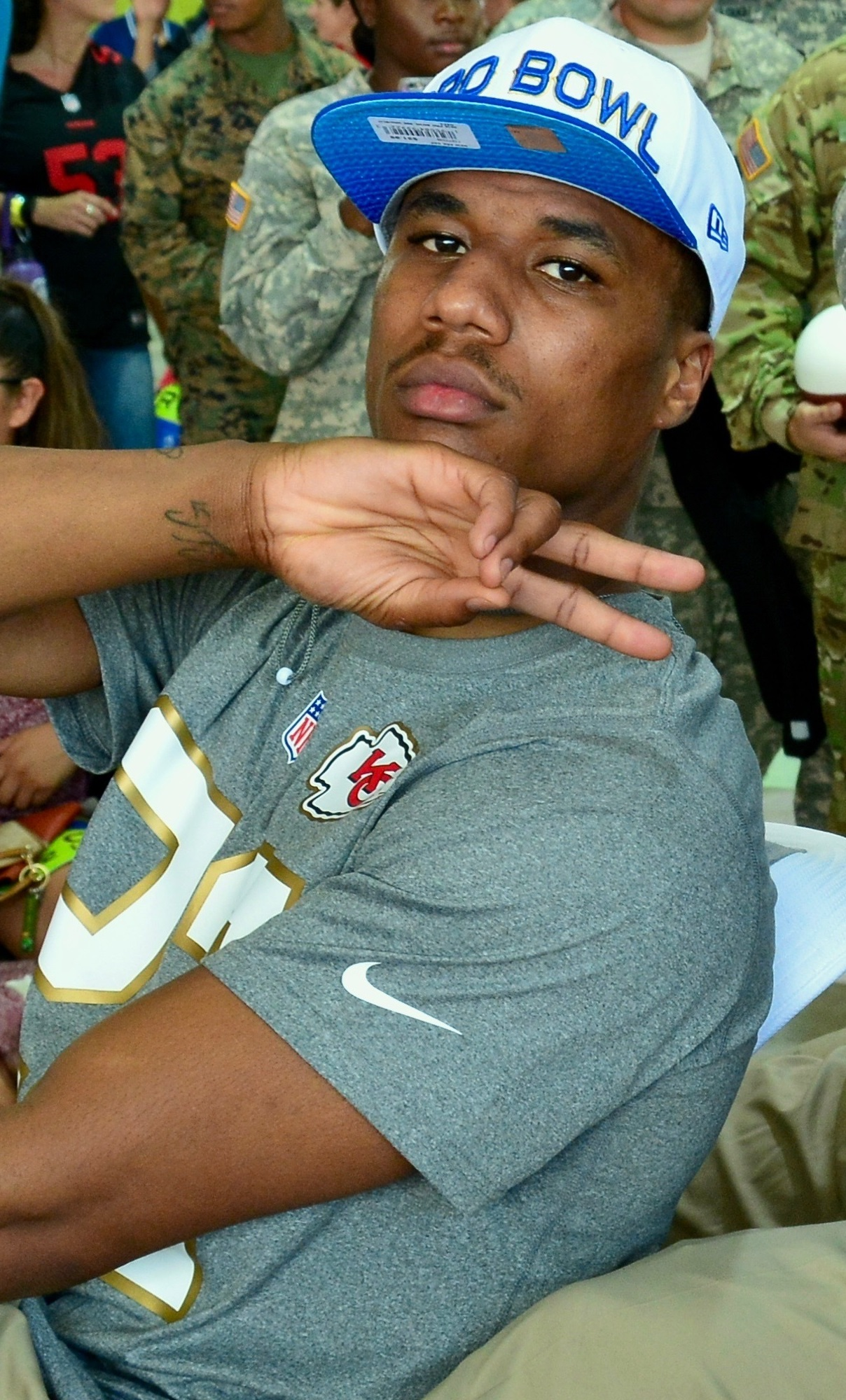
- Peters before the 2016 Pro Bowl

No. 22, 24
- Position: Cornerback

Personal information
- Born: January 9, 1993 (age 33); Oakland, California, U.S.
- Listed height: 6 ft 0 in (1.83 m)
- Listed weight: 197 lb (89 kg)

Career information
- High school: McClymonds (Oakland)
- College: Washington (2011–2014)
- NFL draft: 2015: 1st round, 18th overall pick

Career history

Playing
- Kansas City Chiefs (2015–2017); Los Angeles Rams (2018–2019); Baltimore Ravens (2019–2022); Las Vegas Raiders (2023)

Coaching
- McClymonds (CA) (2026–present) Head coach

Operations
- FCF Beasts (2022–present) Owner

Awards and highlights
- NFL Defensive Rookie of the Year (2015); 2× First-team All-Pro (2016, 2019); 2× Second-team All-Pro (2015, 2019); 3× Pro Bowl (2015, 2016, 2019); NFL interceptions co-leader (2015); PFWA All-Rookie Team (2015); Second-team All-Pac-12 (2013)

Career NFL statistics
- Total tackles: 389
- Forced fumbles: 11
- Fumble recoveries: 10
- Pass deflections: 97
- Interceptions: 33
- Defensive touchdowns: 8
- Stats at Pro Football Reference

Marcus Antonio Peters (born January 9, 1993) is an American former professional football cornerback who played in the National Football League (NFL). He was selected by the Kansas City Chiefs in the first round of the 2015 NFL draft and was also a member of the Los Angeles Rams, Baltimore Ravens, and Las Vegas Raiders. He played college football for the Washington Huskies. Peters currently serves as the head football coach at McClymonds High School.

== Early life ==
Peters attended and graduated from McClymonds High School in Oakland, California, where he played football and ran track. He played as a cornerback on the football team. As a senior, he notched seven interceptions and scored six touchdowns on kick or punt returns. He also played wide receiver and kicker. He was named the MVP of the Oakland Athletic League, as he led the Warriors to a 12–0 record, the school's first perfect season.

In track & field, Peters competed as a sprinter. and as a senior he won the 100 meters (10.87 s) and 200 meters (22.91 s) events at the Oakland Athletic League Championships.

Peters was a three-star recruit by Rivals.com and the 30th best cornerback in his class. He committed to play college football at the University of Washington in January 2011.

== College career ==
Peters was redshirted as a freshman in 2011. As a redshirt freshman in 2012, Peters started eight of 13 games, recording 44 tackles, three interceptions and a touchdown. As a sophomore in 2013, he started 12 of 13 games and had five interceptions, 55 tackles and one sack. As a junior in 2014, Peters was suspended one game for a "sideline tantrum". He was later dismissed from the team in November for disciplinary issues.

== Professional career ==
=== Pre-draft ===
On December 16, 2014, Peters announced his decision to forgo his remaining eligibility and enter the 2015 NFL draft. He attended the NFL Scouting Combine and completed all of the combine and positional drills. On April 2, 2015, Peters participated at Washington's Pro Day, but opted to stand on his combine numbers and only performed positional drills. He attended pre-draft visits with the Kansas City Chiefs, New York Jets, New Orleans Saints, San Francisco 49ers, Oakland Raiders, Pittsburgh Steelers, Baltimore Ravens, and the Houston Texans. He also attended a private workout with the Atlanta Falcons. NFL draft analysts projected Peters would be a first or second round pick. He was ranked as the second best cornerback in the draft by Sports Illustrated. ESPN draft analyst Mike Mayock and NFL analyst Charles Davis ranked Peters as the fourth best cornerback prospect.

External videos
- Marcus Peters' NFL Combine Workout
- Marcus Peters runs 4.53s 40-yard dash

Pre-draft measurables
Height	Weight	Arm length	Hand span	Wingspan	40-yard dash	10-yard split	20-yard split	20-yard shuttle	Three-cone drill	Vertical jump	Broad jump	Bench press
5 ft 11 5/8 in (1.82 m)	197 lb (89 kg)	31 1/2 in (0.80 m)	8 3/8 in (0.21 m)	6 ft 7 in (2.01 m)	4.53 s	1.60 s	2.66 s	4.08 s	7.08 s	37.5 in (0.95 m)	10 ft 1 in (3.07 m)	17 reps
All values from NFL Combine

=== Kansas City Chiefs ===
==== 2015 ====
The Kansas City Chiefs selected Peters in the first round (18th overall) of the 2015 NFL draft. He was the third cornerback drafted and the first of two cornerbacks drafted by the Chiefs in 2015, along with third-round pick (98th overall) Steven Nelson. He became the highest defensive back drafted from Washington since Dana Hall (18th overall) in 1992.

External videos
- Chiefs draft Marcus Peters No. 18

On May 15, 2015, the Chiefs signed Peters to a fully guaranteed four–year, $9.58 million contract that includes a signing bonus of $5.23 million.

Throughout training camp, Peters competed to be a starting cornerback against Phillip Gaines, Marcus Cooper, and Steven Nelson under defensive coordinator Bob Sutton. Head coach Andy Reid named Peters a starting cornerback to begin the regular season, alongside Phillip Gaines. He began the season as the No. 1 starting cornerback after Sean Smith received a three-game suspension following his arrest for a DUI.

On September 15, 2015, Peters made his professional regular season debut and earned his first career start in the Kansas City Chiefs' season-opener at the Houston Texans and recorded seven combined tackles (five solo), made three pass deflections, and had his first career interception on his first career snap, picking off a pass by Brian Hoyer to wide receiver DeAndre Hopkins during a 27–20 victory. The following week, Peters recorded five solo tackles, made a season-high four pass deflections, and scored his first career touchdown on a pick-six during a 31–24 loss against the Denver Broncos in Week 2. He intercepted a pass attempt by quarterback Peyton Manning, thrown to wide receiver Demaryius Thomas, and returned it 55–yards to score his first career touchdown. In Week 5, he set a season-high with seven solo tackles and deflected one pass as the Chiefs lost 18–17 to the Chicago Bears. The following week, he recorded six solo tackles, made one pass deflection, and intercepted a pass by Teddy Bridgewater to wide receiver Mike Wallace during a 10–16 loss at the Minnesota Vikings in Week 6. On November 15, 2015, Peters made two solo tackles, two pass deflections, and intercepted a pass by Peyton Manning to tight end Vernon Davis on the opening drive of a 29–13 victory at the Denver Broncos. His interception was the first of five by the Chiefs in Week 10, with four of them thrown by Peyton Manning to set a record for his career. In Week 13, he recorded six solo tackles, made two pass deflections, and intercepted a pass by Derek Carr to wide receiver Amari Cooper late in the fourth quarter to help secure a 34–20 win at the Oakland Raiders. On December 20, 2015, Peters made three combined tackles (two solo), four pass deflections, set a season-high with two interceptions by Jimmy Clausen, and returned the second for a 90–yard touchdown during a 34–14 at the Baltimore Ravens. On December 22, 2015, it was announced that Peters was one of three rookies voted to the 2016 Pro Bowl. He started in all 16 games and finished with a total of 60 combined tackles (53 solo), 26 pass deflections, eight interceptions, two touchdowns, and a forced fumble. He set career-highs in tackles, pass deflections, and interceptions. His eight interceptions tied Bengals free safety Reggie Nelson for the most interceptions in 2015.

His impressive rookie season in 2015 earned him multiple honors, including second-team All-Pro, AP Defensive Rookie of the Year, and was a finalist for the Pepsi Rookie of the Year award. He became the fourth player in franchise history to earn defensive rookie of the year, joining Dale Carter, Bill Maas, and Hall of Famer Derrick Thomas. He was ranked 65th by his fellow players on the NFL Top 100 Players of 2016.

The Kansas City Chiefs finished the 2015 NFL season second in the AFC West with an 11–5 record to earn a wildcard berth. On January 9, 2016, Peters started in his first career playoff appearance and made four combined tackles (two solo), a pass deflection, and intercepted a pass by Brian Hoyer during a 30–0 victory at the Houston Texans during the AFC Wildcard Game. On January 16, 2016, he recorded five combined tackles (four solo) and deflected two passes during a 27–20 loss at the New England Patriots in the AFC Divisional Round.

==== 2016 ====
He entered training camp slated as the No. 1 starting cornerback following the departure of Sean Smith. Head coach Andy Reid named Peters the No. 1 starting cornerback to begin the season and paired him with Phillip Gaines.

External videos
- Peters strips ball from Kelvin Benjamin
- Every Marcus Peters interception

On September 18, 2016, Peters recorded seven combined tackles (two solo), set a season-high with four pass deflections, and intercepted two passes thrown by Brock Osweiler during a 19–12 loss at the Houston Texans. In Week 3, he recorded one solo tackle, made two pass deflections, and made two interceptions on pass attempts by Ryan Fitzpatrick as the Chiefs defeated the New York Jets 24–3. In Week 9, he set a season-high with seven solo tackles and recovered a fumble as the Chiefs defeated the Jacksonville Jaguars 19–14. He was inactive as the Chiefs lost 17–19 to the Tampa Bay Buccaneers in Week 11 after suffering a hip pointer the previous week. In Week 17, he recorded three combined tackles (two solo), made two pass deflections, and had his sixth interception of the season on a pass by Philip Rivers to wide receiver Dontrelle Inman during a 37–27 victory at the San Diego Chargers. He finished the season with a total of 45 combined tackles (35 solo), 20 passes defensed, six interceptions, and a forced fumble in 15 games and 15 starts. Peters was named to his second career and consecutive Pro Bowl and was named a first-team All-Pro. He was also ranked 32nd on the NFL Top 100 Players of 2017. Peters' six interceptions tied for second in the league in 2016.

==== 2017 ====
He returned as the No. 1 starting cornerback to begin the season and started alongside Terrance Mitchell. In Week 6, he made three solo tackles, two pass deflections, and intercepted a pass by Ben Roethlisberger to wide receiver Antonio Brown during a 13–19 loss against the Pittsburgh Steelers. On October 27, 2017, Peters was fined $9,115 for a helmet hit on Raiders quarterback Derek Carr. On October 30, 2017, Peters made two solo tackles, one pass deflection, an interception, and returned a fumble he forced by running back Jamaal Charles for a 45–yard touchdown during a 29–19 win against the Denver Broncos. During Week 12, he set a season-high with six solo tackles during a 16–10 loss to the Buffalo Bills. In the next game against the Jets, Peters threw a penalty flag into the crowd after teammate Steven Nelson was flagged for holding during a two-point conversion attempt by the Jets. He was flagged for unsportsmanlike conduct that was declined in lieu of accepting the holding penalty. He was seemingly ejected and retreated to the locker room, but would return later although he did not play for the remainder of the 38–31 loss. On December 6, 2017, the Chiefs announced their decision to suspend Peters for the next game. Three days after the suspension was announced, it was revealed that the suspension was also due to an argument with an unnamed coach for the Chiefs. On December 8, 2017, he received a $24,309 fine from the NFL for an unsportsmanlike conduct penalty stemming from the incident with the penalty flag. In Week 15, Peters recorded three solo tackles, made three passes, and set a season-high with two interceptions on passes by Philip Rivers during a 30–13 win against the Los Angeles Chargers. His performance earned him AFC Defensive Player of the Week. He was inactive for the Chiefs' 27–24 victory at the Broncos in Week 17. He finished with 46 combined tackles (42 solo), nine passes defensed, five interceptions, and four forced fumbles in 14 games and 14 starts. He led the Chiefs in interceptions for the third consecutive season. He received an overall grade of 85.7 from Pro Football Focus, which ranked as the 17th best grade among all qualified cornerbacks in 2017. He was ranked 79th by his peers on the NFL Top 100 Players of 2018.

=== Los Angeles Rams ===
==== 2018 ====
On March 14, 2018, the Kansas City Chiefs traded Peters and a sixth-round pick (209th overall) in the 2018 NFL draft to the Los Angeles Rams in return for a 2018 fourth-round pick (124th overall) and second-round pick (61st overall) in the 2019 NFL draft. The Chiefs traded Peters after they acquired Kendall Fuller in a trade with the Washington Redskins as part of a trade for quarterback Alex Smith. It was speculated that the trade was due to a difficult relationship between Peters and the Chiefs' front office and was also rumored to have occurred due to multiple incidents.

On April 24, 2018, the Los Angeles Rams exercised the fifth-year option on Peters' contract. He entered training camp slated as a starting cornerback following the departures of Trumaine Johnson and Kayvon Webster. Head coach Sean McVay named Peters the No. 2 starting cornerback to begin the season and paired him with Aqib Talib.

On September 10, 2018, Peters started in the Los Angeles Rams' season-opener at the Oakland Raiders and made three combined tackles (one solo), one pass deflection, and returned an interception thrown by Derek Carr to tight end Jared Cook for a 50–yard touchdown during a 33–13 victory. On September 14, 2018, he was fined $13,000 for an endzone celebration. During Week 4, Peters set a season-high with six solo tackles as the Rams defeated the Minnesota Vikings 38–31 victory. In Week 11, Peters made one solo tackle, a pass deflection, and secured a 54–51 victory against his former team the, Kansas City Chiefs, by intercepting a pass by Patrick Mahomes to wide receiver Chris Conley with 1:28 remaining in the fourth quarter. In Week 14, he made three solo tackles, one pass deflection, and intercepted a pass attempt by Mitchell Trubisky to wide receiver Josh Bellamy on the opening drive during a 6–15 loss at the Chicago Bears. He started in all 16 and had a total of 43 combined tackles (33 solo), eight pass deflections, three interceptions, and a touchdown. Peters received an overall grade of 60.1 from Pro Football Focus, which ranked 95th among all qualified cornerbacks in 2018.

The Los Angeles Rams finished the 2018 NFL season atop the NFC West with a 13–3 record and earned a first-round bye. They went on to defeat the Dallas Cowboys 30–22 in the NFC Divisional Round and defeated the Saints 26–23 in overtime in the NFC Championship Game. On February 3, 2019, Peters started in Super Bowl LIII and recorded seven combined tackles (five solo) and made one pass deflection as the Rams lost 13–3 against the New England Patriots.

==== 2019 ====
He returned to training camp as a starting cornerback under defensive coordinator Wade Phillips. Head coach Sean McVay retained Peters and Aqib Talib as the starting cornerbacks to begin the season.

On September 29, 2019, Peters made one tackle, two pass deflections, and returned an interception on a pass by Jameis Winston thrown to wide receiver Bobo Wilson for a 32–yard touchdown during a 55–40 loss against the Tampa Bay Buccaneers. In Week 6, Peters made four combined tackles (two solo), a pass deflection, and intercepted a pass attempt by Jimmy Garoppolo to wide receiver Deebo Samuel during a 7–20 loss against the San Francisco 49ers. This marked his last game and last interception as part of the Rams. On October 14, 2019, the Rams officially placed Aqib Talib on injured reserve due to a rib injury he suffered against the Buccaneers the previous day.

=== Baltimore Ravens ===
==== 2019 ====
On October 15, 2019, the Los Angeles Rams traded Peters to the Baltimore Ravens in return for linebacker Kenny Young and a 2020 fifth-round selection. Later that day, the Rams acquired Jalen Ramsey in a trade with the Jacksonville Jaguars. Upon going the Ravens, head coach John Harbaugh immediately inserted Peters into the starting lineup and named him the No. 2 starting cornerback alongside Marlon Humphrey and starting nickelback Brandon Carr.

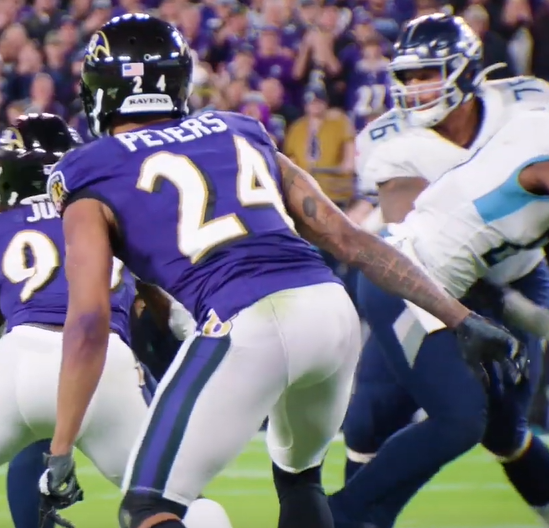
Peters in the AFC Divisional Round of the playoffs against the Tennessee Titans

On October 20, 2019, Peters made his debut with the Ravens and recorded one solo tackle, made one pass deflection, and returned an interception by Russell Wilson on a pass thrown to wide receiver Jaron Brown for a 67–yard touchdown during a 30–16 victory at the Seattle Seahawks. In Week 9, he set a season-high with seven solo tackles (eight combined) and broke up a pass attempt as the Ravens defeated the New England Patriots 37–20. On November 10, 2019, Peters made six combined tackles (five solo), one pass deflection, and had his third pick-six of the season after intercepting a pass by Ryan Finley to wide receiver Alex Erickson for an 89–yard touchdown during a 49–13 win at the Cincinnati Bengals. In Week 12, he tied his season-high of eight combined tackles (six solo), broke up a pass attempt, and intercepted a pass attempt by Jared Goff to wide receiver Robert Woods during a 45–6 victory at his former team's home arena, the Los Angeles Rams. After the game, Peters and Rams cornerback Jalen Ramsey, who the Rams had replace Peters, had an altercation on the field that carried into the tunnel to the locker room.

On December 28, 2019, the Baltimore Ravens signed Peters to a three–year, $42.00 million contract that included $32.46 million guaranteed, $21.00 million guaranteed upon signing, and an initial signing bonus of $8.00 million. He finished the season with a total of 53 combined tackles (40 solo), 14 pass deflections, five interceptions, and one fumble recovery in 16 games and 15 starts. He set a career-high with three touchdowns in 2019. His three interceptions returned for touchdowns tied for fourth for most in a single season, as he became the 21st player with three pick-sixes in a season and the first since William Gay in 2012. He remained the last player to achieve it until DaRon Bland broke the record with five in 2023. He was voted to the 2020 Pro Bowl along with Marlon Humphrey and 11 other Ravens teammates.

==== 2020 ====
He began the season as the No. 2 starting cornerback and was paired with Marlon Humphrey under defensive coordinator Don Martindale. On September 20, 2020, Peters made three combined tackles (two solo), set a season-high with two pass deflections, and intercepted a pass by Deshaun Watson to wide receiver Brandin Cooks during a 33–16 win at the Houston Texans. In Week 5, Peters recorded four solo tackles, made one pass deflection, had an interception, and made his first career sack on Joe Burrow for a 10–yard loss while causing a fumble during a 27–3 win against the Cincinnati Bengals. In Week 9, Peters made five combined tackles (four solo), one pass deflection, intercepted a pass by Philip Rivers, and forced a fumble by Jonathan Taylor that was recovered and returned by teammate Chuck Clark for a 65–yard touchdown during a 24–10 win at the Indianapolis Colts. On December 2, 2020, he set a season-high with six solo tackles and made two pass deflections as the Ravens lost 14–19 at the Pittsburgh Steelers. He was inactive for two games (Weeks 15–16) due to a calf injury. He finished the season with a total of 52 combined tackles (46 solo), nine pass deflections, three interceptions, four forced fumbles, two fumble recoveries, and one sack in 14 games and 14 starts.

The Baltimore Ravens finished the 2020 NFL season with an 11–5 record to earn a Wild-Card berth. On January 10, 2021, Peters recorded four solo tackles, made one pass deflection, and intercepted a pass by Ryan Tannehill with 1:58 remaining in the fourth quarter to help seal a 20–13 win at the Tennessee Titans in the AFC Wild Card Game. The following week, he recorded five combined tackles (three solo) during a 3–17 loss at the Buffalo Bills in the Divisional Round.

==== 2021 ====
He returned to training camp as the No. 2 starting cornerback. Head coach John Harbaugh named him the No. 2 starting cornerback to begin the season alongside Marlon Humphrey. On September 8, 2021, Peters tore his ACL during practice. On September 11, 2021, the Baltimore Ravens officially placed him on injured reserve due to his torn ACL.

==== 2022 ====
On January 27, 2022, the Baltimore Ravens hired Mike Macdonald to be their new defensive coordinator after they decided to part ways with Don Martindale. During training camp, he competed against Kyle Fuller to regain his role as the No. 2 starting cornerback. Head coach John Harbaugh named him a starting cornerback to begin the season and paired him with Marlon Humphrey.

He was inactive as the Ravens defeated the New York Jets 24–9 in Week 1 due to a knee injury. On September 25, 2022, Peters made one solo tackle, one pass deflection, a forced fumble, a fumble recovery, and intercepted a pass by Mac Jones to wide receiver DeVante Parker during a 37–26 at the New England Patriots. In Week 12, he set a season-high with eight combined tackles (six solo) during a 27–28 loss at the Jacksonville Jaguars. On December 17, 2022, Peters recorded three combined tackles (two solo) before exiting in the third quarter of a 3–13 loss at the Cleveland Browns after injuring his calf. He subsequently remained inactive for the last three games (Weeks 16–18) of the season due to his calf injury. He finished the 2022 NFL season with a total of 47 combined tackles (35 solo), six pass deflections, one interception, and one sack in 13 games and 13 starts.

=== Las Vegas Raiders ===
On July 24, 2023, the Las Vegas Raiders signed Peters to a one–year, $3.00 million contract that includes $1.98 million guaranteed and a signing bonus of $815,000. Although he was signed during the middle of training camp, Peters was projected to be the No. 1 starting cornerback under defensive coordinator Patrick Graham. Head coach Josh McDaniels named him the No. 1 starting cornerback to begin the season, starting alongside Jakorian Bennett and nickelback Nate Hobbs.

In Week 7, he set a season-high with seven combined tackles (two solo) and had one pass deflection during a 12–30 loss at the Chicago Bears. In Week 8, Peters made five combined tackles (three solo), one pass deflection, and returned an interception thrown by Jared Goff to wide receiver Amon-Ra St. Brown for a 75–yard touchdown during a 14–26 loss at the Detroit Lions. This marked the last interception and touchdown of his career. On October 31, 2023, the Raiders fired head coach Josh McDaniels, along with General Manager Dave Ziegler, after a 3–5 record to start the season. Linebackers coach Antonio Pierce was appointed to interim head coach for the remainder of the season. In Week 12, Peters was benched in the first half and replaced by Amik Robertson during a 17–31 loss against the Kansas City Chiefs. On November 27, the Raiders officially waived Peters despite him starting all 12 games. He finished the 2023 NFL season with a total of 43 combined tackles (28 solo), five pass deflections, one interception, and a touchdown.

In Peters’ career, he is #1 all-time in NFL interception-return-average for players with at least 25 interceptions.

== Coaching career ==
On March 28, 2026, Peters was hired to serve as the head football coach at McClymonds High School in Oakland, California, succeeding his father in the role.

== Career statistics ==
=== NFL ===
Legend
	Led the league
**Bold**	Career high

==== Regular season ====
Year	Team	Games		Tackles				Fumbles				Interceptions					
Year	Team	GP	GS	Cmb	Solo	Ast	Sck	FF	FR	Yds	TD	PD	Int	Yds	Avg	Lng	TD
2015	KC	16	16	**60**	**53**	7	0.0	1	—	—	—	**26**	**8**	**280**	35.0	**90T**	**2**
2016	KC	15	15	45	35	10	0.0	1	**3**	31	0	20	6	63	10.5	28	0
2017	KC	14	14	46	42	4	0.0	3	2	**45**	**1**	9	5	137	27.4	62	0
2018	LAR	16	16	43	33	10	0.0	—	—	—	—	8	3	107	35.7	50T	1
2019	LAR	6	6	14	9	5	0.0	—	1	0	0	4	2	32	16.0	32T	1
2019	BAL	10	9	39	31	8	0.0	—	—	—	—	10	3	178	59.3	89T	**2**
2020	BAL	14	14	52	46	6	**1.0**	**4**	2	-3	0	9	4	17	4.3	12	0
2021	BAL	Did not play due to injury															
2022	BAL	13	13	47	35	12	**1.0**	2	2	0	0	6	1	8	8.0	8	0
2023	LV	12	12	43	28	**15**	0.0	—	—	—	—	5	1	75	**75.0**	75T	1
Career		116	115	389	312	77	2.0	11	10	73	1	97	33	897	27.2	90T	7

==== Postseason ====
Year	Team	Games		Tackles				Fumbles				Interceptions					
Year	Team	GP	GS	Cmb	Solo	Ast	Sck	FF	FR	Yds	TD	PD	Int	Yds	Avg	Lng	TD
2015	KC	2	2	9	6	**3**	0.0	—	—	—	—	**3**	**1**	2	2.0	2	0
2016	KC	1	1	6	4	2	0.0	—	—	—	—	1	0	0	0.0	0	0
2017	KC	1	1	4	4	0	0.0	—	—	—	—	1	**1**	**28**	**28.0**	**28**	0
2018	LAR	3	3	**11**	**8**	**3**	0.0	—	—	—	—	2	0	0	0.0	0	0
2019	BAL	1	1	2	2	0	0.0	—	—	—	—	1	0	0	0.0	0	0
2020	BAL	2	2	9	7	2	0.0	—	—	—	—	1	**1**	13	13.0	13	0
2022	BAL	1	1	4	2	2	0.0	—	—	—	—	1	0	0	0.0	0	0
Career		11	11	45	33	12	0.0	0	0	0	0	10	3	43	14.3	28	0

=== College ===
Season	Team	GP	Tackles				Interceptions						Fumbles	
Season	Team	GP	Cmb	Solo	Ast	Sck	PD	Int	Yds	Avg	Lng	TD	FF	FR
2012	Washington	13	44	26	18	0.0	11	3	54	18.0	26	1	0	1
2013	Washington	13	55	44	11	1.0	14	5	18	3.6	14	0	1	2
2014	Washington	8	30	25	5	0.0	10	3	0	0.0	0	0	0	0
Total		34	129	95	34	1.0	35	11	72	6.5	26	1	1	3

== Fan Controlled Football ==
On May 12, 2022, Peters joined the FCF Beasts as an owner.

== See also ==
- Washington Huskies football statistical leaders
