= 2019 Oakland Raiders season =

60th season in franchise history, final one in Oakland

- Raiders 60th season logo
- Owner: Mark Davis
- General manager: Mike Mayock
- Head coach: Jon Gruden
- Home stadium: RingCentral Coliseum

Results
- Record: 7–9
- Division place: 3rd AFC West
- Playoffs: Did not qualify
- All-Pros: C Rodney Hudson (2nd team)
- Pro Bowlers: OT Trent Brown; C Rodney Hudson

Uniform
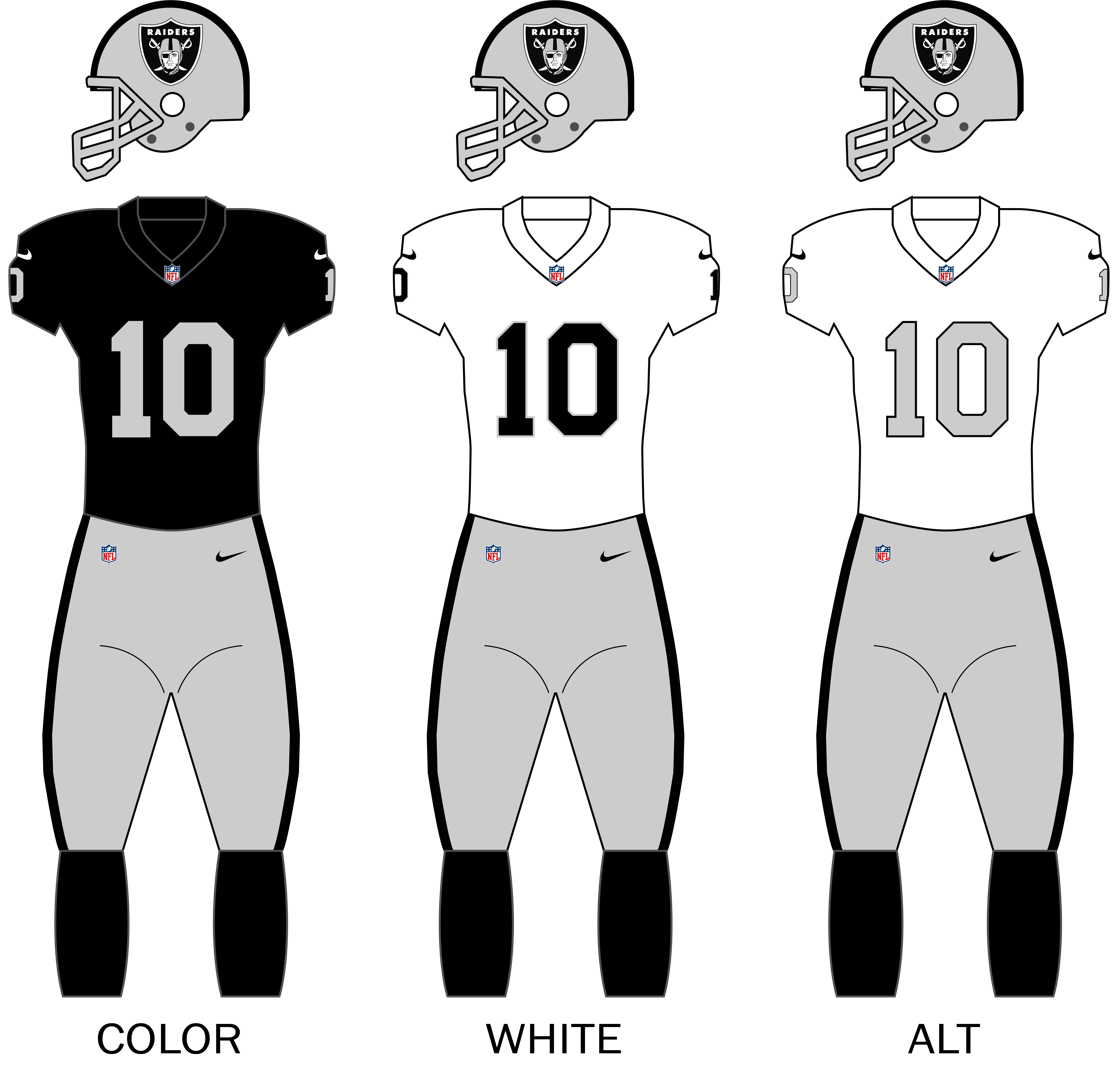

The 2019 season was the Oakland Raiders' 60th since they were founded, their 50th in the National Football League (NFL) and their second under head coach Jon Gruden since his rehiring by the organization (sixth overall). It was the Raiders’ and NFL's last season in Oakland. The Raiders finished the season 7–9, improving on the prior season 4–12 record, but failing to make the playoffs for the third straight year and the 16th time in the last 17 years.

The Raiders were not eliminated from playoff contention until the final week of the season after losing to the Denver Broncos. Although they surprisingly started the season 6–4, leading some to believe they could potentially challenge the Kansas City Chiefs for the AFC West title, the Raiders would suffer a late season collapse losing five of their last six games, including the last game in Oakland to the Jacksonville Jaguars.

After initially stating they would not return to RingCentral Coliseum for 2019, the Raiders were effectively forced to return to the stadium after their regional rivals, the San Francisco 49ers, blocked an effort to play at Oracle Park while they awaited the completion of Allegiant Stadium in Paradise, Nevada. This was the 25th and final season in the team's second tenure in Oakland and marked the end of the team's longest continuous tenure in one city. It was announced on June 11, 2019, that the Raiders would be featured on HBO's Hard Knocks, premiering on August 6, 2019.

Prior to the season, the Raiders hired former NFL Network draft guru and former Notre Dame Football on NBC color commentator Mike Mayock as general manager.

To commemorate their 60th season, the Raiders wore a special logo which incorporated the torch lit at Raider games in honor of former owner Al Davis. Oakland went 5–3 at home, but only 2–6 on the road, which ultimately cost them a trip to the postseason.

== Stadium negotiations ==
In December 2018, the Raiders indicated they would not return to the Oakland–Alameda County Coliseum (renamed RingCentral Coliseum under a naming rights deal secured in May 2019) upon the expiration of its lease on the stadium after the Oakland-Alameda County Coliseum Authority filed a lawsuit against the team, seeking financial damages, and would be seeking another venue for the 2019 season. The Raiders then began negotiating a lease with Oracle Park in San Francisco in February 2019; however, the San Francisco 49ers refused to waive their territorial rights, effectively vetoing the deal. The team briefly negotiated for sharing Levi's Stadium with the 49ers, but the proposal was reportedly rejected for costing more than the Coliseum's asking price.

Unlike the case of the Tennessee Titans, in which the team played in Memphis' Liberty Bowl Memorial Stadium for 1997 and Nashville's Vanderbilt Stadium for 1998 until their new stadium was completed in 1999, the state of Nevada's two largest college stadiums, Mackay Stadium in Reno and Sam Boyd Stadium in Whitney, were either rejected or never considered.

On February 25, 2019, the Raiders reached an agreement in principle with the Coliseum Authority to return to the Coliseum for at least the 2019 season. Rent for the 2019 season cost the team $7.5 million, and rent for the 2020 season would have increased to $10.5 million if the option was invoked due to construction delays to Allegiant Stadium; the option for the 2020 season was never exercised. As part of the lease agreement, the Raiders did not receive naming rights revenue from RingCentral, and game-day expenses for the Coliseum Authority would also be capped. On March 15, 2019, the Coliseum Authority voted to approve the lease, while the Alameda County Board of Supervisors and Oakland City Council voted in favor of the lease on March 19 and 21, respectively, clearing all legal hurdles in time for the NFL's owners meetings on March 24.

== Roster transactions ==
=== Free agents signed ===
Position	Player	Age	2018 team
WR	Tyrell Williams	27	Los Angeles Chargers
OT	Trent Brown	25	New England Patriots
S	Lamarcus Joyner	28	Los Angeles Rams
LB	Vontaze Burfict	28	Cincinnati Bengals
DE	Josh Mauro	28	New York Giants
WR	J. J. Nelson	26	Arizona Cardinals
QB	Mike Glennon	29	Arizona Cardinals
CB	Nevin Lawson	27	Detroit Lions
OG	Jordan Devey	31	Kansas City Chiefs
S	Curtis Riley	26	New York Giants
WR	Ryan Grant	28	Indianapolis Colts
QB	Landry Jones	29	Jacksonville Jaguars
TE	Luke Willson	29	Detroit Lions
OG	Richie Incognito	35	No team (out of football)

=== Players released ===
Position	Player	Age	2019 team
OT	Donald Penn	35	Washington Redskins
QB	A. J. McCarron	28	Houston Texans
WR	Jordy Nelson	33	N/A (Retired)
WR	Seth Roberts	28	Baltimore Ravens
WR	Antonio Brown	31	New England Patriots

=== Players lost ===
Position	Player	Age	2019 team
TE	Jared Cook	31	New Orleans Saints
G	Jon Feliciano	27	Buffalo Bills
CB	Rashaan Melvin	29	Detroit Lions

=== Acquired in trade ===
Position	Player	Age	Acquired from	Compensation sent
WR	Antonio Brown	30	Pittsburgh Steelers	2019 3rd-round pick (66th overall); 2019 5th-round pick (141st overall)

=== Traded away ===
Position	Player	Age	Traded to	Compensation received
OG	Kelechi Osemele; CHI's 2019 6th round pick (196th overall)	29	New York Jets	2019 5th round pick (140th overall)
CB	Gareon Conley	24	Houston Texans	SEA's 2020 3rd round pick (? overall)

=== Draft ===
2019 Oakland Raiders draft selections
Round	Selection	Player name	Position	College	Notes
1	4	Clelin Ferrell	DE	Clemson	
1	24	Josh Jacobs	RB	Alabama	From Chicago (Note: The Raiders traded 2020 second- and conditional seventh-round selections, and OLB Khalil Mack to the Chicago Bears in exchange for first- and sixth-round selections (24th and 196th overall), and 2020 first- and third-round selections.)
1	27	Johnathan Abram	S	Mississippi State	From Dallas (Note: The Raiders traded WR Amari Cooper to the Dallas Cowboys in exchange for a first-round selection (27th overall).)
2	35	Traded to the Jacksonville Jaguars (Note: The Raiders traded second-, fifth- and seventh-round selections (35th, 140th and 235th overall) to the Jacksonville Jaguars in exchange for second- and fourth-round selections (38th and 109th overall).)			
2	38	Traded to the Buffalo Bills (Note: The Raiders traded a second-round selection (38th overall) to the Buffalo Bills in exchange for second- and fifth-round selections (40th and 158th overall).)			From Jaguars
2	40	Trayvon Mullen	CB	Clemson	From Bills
3	66	Traded to the Pittsburgh Steelers (Note: The Raiders traded third- and fifth-round selections (66th and 141st overall) to the Pittsburgh Steelers in exchange for WR Antonio Brown.)			
4	106	Maxx Crosby	DE	Eastern Michigan	
4	109	Traded to the Indianapolis Colts (Note: The Raiders traded a fourth-round selection (109th overall) to the Indianapolis Colts in exchange for two fourth-round selections (129th and 135th overall).)			From Jaguars
4	129	Isaiah Johnson	CB	Houston	From Colts
4	135	Traded to the Atlanta Falcons (Note: The Raiders traded a fourth-round selection (135th overall) to the Atlanta Falcons in exchange for fourth- and seventh-round selections (137th and 230th overall).)			From Colts
4	137	Foster Moreau	TE	LSU	From Falcons
5	140	Traded to the Jacksonville Jaguars			From Jets (Note: The Raiders traded a sixth-round selection (196th overall) and G Kelechi Osemele to the New York Jets in exchange for a fifth-round selection (140th overall).)
5	141	Traded to the Pittsburgh Steelers			
5	149	Hunter Renfrow	WR	Clemson	From Bengals via Cowboys (Note: The Raiders traded fifth- and seventh-round selections (158th and 218th overall) to the Dallas Cowboys in exchange for a fifth-round selection (149th overall).)
5	158	Traded to the Dallas Cowboys			From Steelers (Note: The Raiders traded a sixth-round selection (175th overall) and WR Ryan Switzer to the Pittsburgh Steelers in exchange for a fifth-round selection (158th overall).) via Raiders (Note: The Raiders traded a fifth-round selection (158th overall) to the Buffalo Bills in exchange for QB A. J. McCarron.) and Bills
6	175	Traded to the Pittsburgh Steelers			
6	196	Traded to the New York Jets			From Bears
7	218	Traded to the Dallas Cowboys			
7	230	Quinton Bell	DE	Prairie View A&M	From Falcons
7	235	Traded to the Jacksonville Jaguars			From Seahawks (Note: The Raiders traded S Shalom Luani to the Seattle Seahawks in exchange for a seventh-round selection (235th overall).)

Draft trades

== Staff ==
2019 Oakland Raiders staff
Front office: Owner – Mark Davis; President – Marc Badain; Executive vice president/general counsel – Dan Ventrelle; General manager – Mike Mayock; Senior vice president/director of football administration – Tom Delaney; Assistant director of player personnel – DuJuan Daniels; Assistant director of player personnel – Trey Scott; Director of pro personnel – Dwayne Joseph; Director of college scouting – Jim Abrams; Assistant director of college scouting – Teddy Atlas; Senior advisor to the general manager – Walter Juliff; Head coaches: Head coach – Jon Gruden; Assistant head coach/special teams coordinator – Rich Bisaccia; Offensive coaches: Offensive coordinator – Greg Olson; Senior offensive assistant – John Morton; Running backs – Kirby Wilson; Wide receivers – Edgar Bennett; Tight ends – Frank Smith; Offensive line – Tom Cable; Assistant offensive line – Lemuel Jeanpierre; Offensive quality control – Nick Holz; Offensive quality control – Tim Berbenich	Defensive coaches: Defensive coordinator – Paul Guenther; Senior defensive assistant – Mike Trgovac; Defensive line – Brentson Buckner; Assistant defensive line – Travis Smith; Linebackers – David Lippincott; Defensive backs – Jim O'Neil; Assistant defensive backs – Taver Johnson; Special teams coaches: Assistant special teams – Byron Storer; Strength and conditioning: Head strength and conditioning – A. J. Neibel; Strength and conditioning assistant – D'Anthony Batiste; Strength and conditioning assistant – Deuce Gruden; Strength and conditioning assistant – Rick Slate; Nutritionist – Ricky Ng

== Final roster ==
2019 Oakland Raiders roster
Quarterbacks (QB): 4 Derek Carr; 7 Mike Glennon; 14 DeShone Kizer; Running backs (RB): 45 Alec Ingold FB; 28 Josh Jacobs; 30 Jalen Richard; 34 Rod Smith; 33 DeAndré Washington; Wide receivers (WR): 88 Marcell Ateman; 18 Keelan Doss; 10 Rico Gafford; 12 Zay Jones; 13 Hunter Renfrow; 16 Tyrell Williams; Tight ends (TE): 85 Derek Carrier; 82 Eric Tomlinson; 83 Darren Waller	Offensive linemen (OL): 67 Lester Cotton G; 71 Denzelle Good G; 61 Rodney Hudson C; 64 Richie Incognito G; 66 Gabe Jackson G; 68 Andre James C; 74 Kolton Miller T; 75 Brandon Parker T; 72 David Sharpe T; Defensive linemen (DL): 98 Maxx Crosby DE; 96 Clelin Ferrell DE; 92 P. J. Hall DT; 90 Johnathan Hankins DT; 73 Maurice Hurst II DT; 95 Dion Jordan DE; 97 Josh Mauro DE; 91 Benson Mayowa DE; 93 Olsen Pierre DE; 94 Jeremiah Valoaga DE	Linebackers (LB): 51 Will Compton MLB; 54 Ukeme Eligwe OLB; 50 Nicholas Morrow OLB; 59 Tahir Whitehead OLB; 58 Kyle Wilber OLB; Defensive backs (DB): 25 Erik Harris SS; 31 Isaiah Johnson CB; 29 Lamarcus Joyner FS; 26 Nevin Lawson CB; 32 Dallin Leavitt SS; 27 Trayvon Mullen CB; 22 Keisean Nixon CB; 35 Curtis Riley FS; 20 Daryl Worley CB; Special teams (ST): 8 Daniel Carlson K; 6 AJ Cole P; 47 Trent Sieg LS	Practice squad: 79 Ade Aruna DE; 39 Jordan Brown CB; 36 James Butler RB; 81 Paul Butler TE; 56 Te'von Coney MLB; 57 Kendall Donnerson DE; 70 Kyle Kalis G; 37 Dylan Mabin CB (IR); 62 Erik Magnuson C; 15 De'Mornay Pierson-El WR; 19 Anthony Ratliff-Williams WR; Reserve: 24 Johnathan Abram SS (IR); 77 Trent Brown T (IR); 55 Vontaze Burfict MLB (Susp.); 20 Isaiah Crowell RB (IR); 65 Jordan Devey G (IR); 43 Makinton Dorleant CB (IR); 17 Dwayne Harris WR (IR); 63 Cameron Hunt G (IR); 42 Karl Joseph FS (IR); 99 Arden Key DE (IR); 40 D. J. Killings CB (IR); 52 Marquel Lee OLB (IR); 87 Foster Moreau TE (IR); 23 Nick Nelson CB (IR); 3 Nathan Peterman QB (IR); Rookies in italics 53 active, 16 reserve, 10 practice squad

== Preseason ==
The Raiders' preseason opponents and schedule were announced in the spring. On March 27, Green Bay Packers President Mark Murphy stated during the league owners' meetings that the Packers and Raiders were in negotiations to play a preseason game August 22 at Investors Group Field in Winnipeg, Manitoba, with the Raiders as the designated home team. Mosaic Stadium in Regina, Saskatchewan was another potential site for the game, and the teams secured the cooperation of the city and local sports promoter On Ice Management, but the Saskatchewan Roughriders vetoed the proposal; the Roughriders feared they would be unable to reconfigure the field from NFL to CFL standards in time for the Roughriders' August 24 home game. When the preseason schedule was released, the August 22 Packers-Raiders game was subtly noted as a neutral-site contest, with no location identified. The Raiders confirmed the Winnipeg game June 5. Had the Winnipeg negotiations fallen through, or in the event the game cannot be held in Winnipeg, the game would be moved to Lambeau Field, thus effectively giving the Raiders only one home game and three away games.

Shortly before the game started, 33 Packers players (among them starting quarterback Aaron Rodgers) raised objections to the turf fill used to patch the holes where the goal posts had been in their CFL configurations and refused to play. In an unsuccessful effort to assuage those concerns, the league reconfigured the field such that the field was shortened to 80 yards and the last ten yards on each end was converted to end zones.

Week	Date	Opponent	Result	Record	Venue	Recap
1	August 10	Los Angeles Rams	W 14–3	1–0	RingCentral Coliseum	Recap
2	August 15	at Arizona Cardinals	W 33–26	2–0	State Farm Stadium	Recap
3	August 22	Green Bay Packers	W 22–21	3–0	(Canada) IG Field (Winnipeg)	Recap
4	August 29	at Seattle Seahawks	L 15–17	3–1	CenturyLink Field	Recap

== Regular season ==
=== Schedule ===
Week	Date	Opponent	Result	Record	Venue	Recap
1	September 9	**Denver Broncos**	**W** 24–16	1–0	RingCentral Coliseum	Recap
2	September 15	**Kansas City Chiefs**	**L** 10–28	1–1	RingCentral Coliseum	Recap
3	September 22	at Minnesota Vikings	**L** 14–34	1–2	U.S. Bank Stadium	Recap
4	September 29	at Indianapolis Colts	**W** 31–24	2–2	Lucas Oil Stadium	Recap
5	October 6	Chicago Bears	**W** 24–21	3–2	(United Kingdom) Tottenham Hotspur Stadium (London)	Recap
6	Bye					
7	October 20	at Green Bay Packers	**L** 24–42	3–3	Lambeau Field	Recap
8	October 27	at Houston Texans	**L** 24–27	3–4	NRG Stadium	Recap
9	November 3	Detroit Lions	**W** 31–24	4–4	RingCentral Coliseum	Recap
10	November 7	**Los Angeles Chargers**	**W** 26–24	5–4	RingCentral Coliseum	Recap
11	November 17	Cincinnati Bengals	**W** 17–10	6–4	RingCentral Coliseum	Recap
12	November 24	at New York Jets	**L** 3–34	6–5	MetLife Stadium	Recap
13	December 1	at **Kansas City Chiefs**	**L** 9–40	6–6	Arrowhead Stadium	Recap
14	December 8	Tennessee Titans	**L** 21–42	6–7	RingCentral Coliseum	Recap
15	December 15	Jacksonville Jaguars	**L** 16–20	6–8	RingCentral Coliseum	Recap
16	December 22	at **Los Angeles Chargers**	**W** 24–17	7–8	Dignity Health Sports Park	Recap
17	December 29	at **Denver Broncos**	**L** 15–16	7–9	Empower Field at Mile High	Recap

Note: Intra-division opponents are in bold text.

=== Game summaries ===
==== Week 1: vs. Denver Broncos ====
Week 1: Denver Broncos at Oakland Raiders – Game summary

Quarter	1	2	3	4	Total
Broncos	0	0	6	10	**16**
**Raiders**	7	7	0	10	**24**

at RingCentral Coliseum, Oakland, California

- Date: September 9
- Game time: 7:20 p.m. PDT
- Game weather: Breezy, 68 °F (20 °C)
- Game attendance: 52,359
- Referee: Craig Wrolstad
- TV announcers (ESPN): Steve Levy, Brian Griese, Louis Riddick and Dianna Russini
- Recap, Game Book

Game information

**First quarter**

- OAK – Tyrell Williams 8-yard pass from Derek Carr (Daniel Carlson kick), 8:52. Raiders 7–0. **Drive: 10 plays, 72 yards, 6:08.**

**Second quarter**

- OAK – Josh Jacobs 2-yard run (Daniel Carlson kick), 3:30. Raiders 14–0. **Drive: 13 plays, 95 yards, 8:35.**

**Third quarter**

- DEN – Brandon McManus 26-yard field goal, 9:20. Raiders 14–3. **Drive: 12 plays, 67 yards, 5:40.**
- DEN – Brandon McManus 26-yard field goal, 3:42. Raiders 14–6. **Drive: 10 plays, 68 yards, 3:21.**

**Fourth quarter**

- OAK – Josh Jacobs 4-yard run (Daniel Carlson kick), 11:52. Raiders 21–6. **Drive: 5 plays, 60 yards, 2:59.**
- DEN – Brandon McManus 39-yard field goal, 8:39. Raiders 21–9. **Drive: 6 plays, 54 yards, 3:13.**
- OAK – Daniel Carlson 29-yard field goal, 4:38. Raiders 24–9. **Drive: 6 plays, 19 yards, 4:01.**
- DEN – Emmanuel Sanders 1-yard pass from Joe Flacco (Brandon McManus kick), 2:15. Raiders 24–16. **Drive: 8 plays, 75 yards, 2:23.**

**Top passers**

- DEN – Joe Flacco – 21/31, 268 yards, TD
- OAK – Derek Carr – 22/26, 259 yards, TD

**Top rushers**

- DEN – Royce Freeman – 10 rushes, 56 yards
- OAK – Josh Jacobs – 23 rushes, 85 yards, 2 TD

**Top receivers**

- DEN – Courtland Sutton – 7 receptions, 120 yards
- OAK – Tyrell Williams – 6 receptions, 105 yards, TD

Just days before the game, the Raiders released wide receiver Antonio Brown, who was acquired via trade prior to the season, stemming from conduct detrimental to the team, including a heated argument with general manager Mike Mayock. However, the Raiders played well without Brown, as quarterback Derek Carr, wide receiver Tyrell Williams, and rookie running back Josh Jacobs all had strong performances, with the defense stifling Broncos quarterback Joe Flacco for much of the game. With a statement win, the Raiders opened their final season in Oakland at 1–0.

==== Week 2: vs. Kansas City Chiefs ====
Week 2: Kansas City Chiefs at Oakland Raiders – Game summary

Quarter	1	2	3	4	Total
**Chiefs**	0	28	0	0	**28**
Raiders	10	0	0	0	**10**

at RingCentral Coliseum, Oakland, California

- Date: September 15
- Game time: 1:05 p.m. PDT
- Game weather: Sunny, 70 °F (21 °C)
- Game attendance: 52,748
- Referee: Clay Martin
- TV announcers (CBS): Jim Nantz, Tony Romo and Tracy Wolfson
- Recap, Game Book

Game information

**First quarter**

- OAK – Daniel Carlson 28-yard field goal, 10:21. Raiders 3–0 **Drive: 10 plays, 65 yards, 4:39.**
- OAK – Tyrell Williams 4-yard pass from Derek Carr (Daniel Carlson kick), 4:46. Raiders 10–0. **Drive: 6 plays, 74 yards, 2:38.**

**Second quarter**

- KC – Demarcus Robinson 44-yard pass from Patrick Mahomes (Harrison Butker kick), 14:55. Raiders 10–7. **Drive: 3 plays, 72 yards, 1:10.**
- KC – Mecole Hardman 42-yard pass from Patrick Mahomes (Harrison Butker kick), 5:51. Chiefs 14–10. **Drive: 14 plays, 95 yards, 6:32.**
- KC – Travis Kelce 27-yard pass from Patrick Mahomes (Harrison Butker kick), 1:41. Chiefs 21–10. **Drive: 5 plays, 94 yards, 1:52.**
- KC – Demarcus Robinson 39-yard pass from Patrick Mahomes (Harrison Butker kick), 0:40. Chiefs 28–10. **Drive: 1 play, 39 yards, 0:07.**

**Third quarter**

- No scoring plays.

**Fourth quarter**

- No scoring plays.

**Top passers**

- KC – Patrick Mahomes – 30/44, 443 yards, 4 TD
- OAK – Derek Carr – 23/38, 198 yards, TD, 2 INT

**Top rushers**

- KC – LeSean McCoy – 11 rushes, 23 yards
- OAK – Josh Jacobs – 12 rushes, 99 yards

**Top receivers**

- KC – Demarcus Robinson – 6 receptions, 172 yards, 2 TD
- OAK – Darren Waller – 6 receptions, 63 yards

Against traditional rival Kansas City, Oakland took a 10–0 lead in the first quarter, but the Chiefs stormed back with four touchdown passes from quarterback Patrick Mahomes in the second quarter. Despite the Chiefs being hampered by injuries to key offensive players such as Mahomes, Damien Williams and LeSean McCoy in the second half, the Raiders could not take advantage as Derek Carr threw two interceptions in the third quarter, and the offense was forced to punt on its final two possessions of the game. Oakland fell to 1–1 with the loss. This was the final football game at the Coliseum with the baseball diamond present.

==== Week 3: at Minnesota Vikings ====
Week 3: Oakland Raiders at Minnesota Vikings – Game summary

Quarter	1	2	3	4	Total
Raiders	0	7	0	7	**14**
**Vikings**	7	14	7	6	**34**

at U.S. Bank Stadium, Minneapolis, Minnesota

- Date: September 22
- Game time: 12:00 p.m. CDT/10:00 a.m. PDT
- Game weather: None (indoor stadium)
- Game attendance: 66,738
- Referee: Jerome Boger
- TV announcers (Fox): Dick Stockton, Mark Schlereth and Jennifer Hale
- Recap, Game Book

Game information

**First quarter**

- MIN – Adam Thielen 35-yard pass from Kirk Cousins (Dan Bailey kick), 11:21. Vikings 7–0. **Drive: 6 plays, 76 yards, 3:39.**

**Second quarter**

- MIN – Dalvin Cook 1-yard run (Dan Bailey kick), 14:55. Vikings 14–0. **Drive: 12 plays, 79 yards, 5:25.**
- MIN – Adam Thielen 1-yard run (Dan Bailey kick), 11:06. Vikings 21–0. **Drive: 6 plays, 30 yards, 3:07.**
- OAK – J. J. Nelson 29-yard pass from Derek Carr (Daniel Carlson kick), 7:26. Vikings 21–7. **Drive: 7 plays, 75 yards, 3:40.**

**Third quarter**

- MIN – Alexander Mattison 10-yard run (Dan Bailey kick), 7:28. Vikings 28–7. **Drive: 10 plays, 92 yards, 5:25.**

**Fourth quarter**

- MIN – Dan Bailey 50-yard field goal, 14:55. Vikings 31–7. **Drive: 6 plays, 30 yards, 3:19.**
- MIN – Dan Bailey 24-yard field goal, 3:45. Vikings 34–7. **Drive: 7 plays, 53 yards, 4:44.**
- OAK – Tyrell Williams 11-yard pass from Derek Carr (Daniel Carlson kick), 1:23. Vikings 34–14. **Drive: 8 plays, 75 yards, 2:22.**

**Top passers**

- OAK – Derek Carr – 27/34, 242 yards, 2 TD, INT
- MIN – Kirk Cousins – 15/21, 174 yards, TD

**Top rushers**

- OAK – Josh Jacobs – 10 rushes, 44 yards
- MIN – Dalvin Cook – 16 rushes, 110 yards, TD

**Top receivers**

- OAK – Darren Waller – 13 receptions, 134 yards
- MIN – Irv Smith Jr. – 3 receptions, 60 yards

==== Week 4: at Indianapolis Colts ====
Week 4: Oakland Raiders at Indianapolis Colts – Game summary

Quarter	1	2	3	4	Total
**Raiders**	14	7	3	7	**31**
Colts	7	3	0	14	**24**

at Lucas Oil Stadium, Indianapolis, Indiana

- Date: September 29
- Game time: 1:00 p.m. EDT/10:00 a.m. PDT
- Game weather: None (retractable roof closed)
- Game attendance: 62,259
- Referee: Scott Novak
- TV announcers (CBS): Kevin Harlan, Rich Gannon and John Schriffen
- Recap, Game Book

Game information

**First quarter**

- OAK – Foster Moreau 18-yard pass from Derek Carr (Daniel Carlson kick), 9:09. Raiders 7–0. **Drive: 10 plays, 75 yards, 5:51.**
- OAK – Trevor Davis 60-yard run (Daniel Carlson kick), 8:03. Raiders 14–0. **Drive: 1 play, 60 yards, 0:10.**
- IND – Jack Doyle 5-yard pass from Jacoby Brissett (Adam Vinatieri kick), 5:22. Raiders 14–7. **Drive: 3 plays, 22 yards, 1:14.**

**Second quarter**

- OAK – Tyrell Williams 19-yard pass from Derek Carr (Daniel Carlson kick), 14:13. Raiders 21–7. **Drive: 11 plays, 76 yards, 6:09.**
- IND – Adam Vinatieri 26-yard field goal, 7:33. Raiders 21–10. **Drive: 12 plays, 67 yards, 6:40.**

**Third quarter**

- OAK – Daniel Carlson 26-yard field goal, 3:14. Raiders 24–10. **Drive: 16 plays, 82 yards, 9:12.**

**Fourth quarter**

- IND – Chester Rogers 4-yard pass from Jacoby Brissett (Adam Vinatieri kick), 5:27. Raiders 24–17. **Drive: 14 plays, 90 yards, 4:54.**
- OAK – Erik Harris 30-yard interception return (Daniel Carlson kick), 2:09. Raiders 31–17.
- IND – Eric Ebron 48-yard pass from Jacoby Brissett (Adam Vinatieri kick), 1:10. Raiders 31–24. **Drive: 6 plays, 75 yards, 0:59.**

**Top passers**

- OAK – Derek Carr – 21/31, 189 yards, 2 TD
- IND – Jacoby Brissett – 24/46, 265 yards, 3 TD, INT

**Top rushers**

- OAK – Josh Jacobs – 17 rushes, 79 yards
- IND – Marlon Mack – 11 rushes, 39 yards

**Top receivers**

- OAK – Darren Waller – 7 receptions, 53 yards
- IND – Zach Pascal – 4 receptions, 72 yards

After two consecutive losses, Oakland surprised the Colts by taking a 21–10 halftime lead. Though the Colts managed to cut the Raiders' lead to seven by the fourth quarter, Colts quarterback Jacoby Brissett threw a crucial pick-six to Raiders safety Erik Harris just before the two-minute warning, effectively putting the game away for Oakland. With the win, the Raiders improved to 2–2. Linebacker Vontaze Burfict was ejected from the game and later suspended the rest of the season for initiating two helmet-to-helmet hits, including one on Colts tight end Jack Doyle.

==== Week 5: vs. Chicago Bears ====
NFL London Games

Week 5: Chicago Bears at Oakland Raiders – Game summary

Quarter	1	2	3	4	Total
Bears	0	0	21	0	**21**
**Raiders**	0	17	0	7	**24**

at Tottenham Hotspur Stadium, London, England

- Date: October 6
- Game time: 6:00 p.m. BST/10:00 a.m. PDT
- Game weather: Cloudy, 59 °F (15 °C)
- Game attendance: 60,463
- Referee: Tony Corrente
- TV announcers (Fox): Dick Stockton, Mark Schlereth and Jennifer Hale
- Recap, Game Book

Game information

**First quarter**

- No scoring plays.

'Second quarter

- OAK – Josh Jacobs 12-yard run (Daniel Carlson kick), 14:55. Raiders 7–0. **Drive: 10 plays, 90 yards, 5:06.**
- OAK – DeAndre Washington 3-yard run (Daniel Carlson kick), 9:51. Raiders 14–0. **Drive: 6 plays, 24 yards, 3:32.**
- OAK – Daniel Carlson 41-yard field goal, 1:56. Raiders 17–0. **Drive: 11 plays, 28 yards, 5:36.**

**Third quarter**

- CHI – David Montgomery 1-yard run (Eddy Piñeiro kick), 12:43. Raiders 17–7. **Drive: 2 plays, 14 yards, 0:36.**
- CHI – Allen Robinson 4-yard pass from Chase Daniel (Eddy Piñeiro kick), 3:56. Raiders 17–14. **Drive: 12 plays, 89 yards, 6:20.**
- CHI – Allen Robinson 16-yard pass from Chase Daniel (Eddy Piñeiro kick), 1:16. Bears 21–17. **Drive: 1 play, 16 yards, 0:25.**

Fourth quarter

- OAK – Josh Jacobs 2-yard run (Daniel Carlson kick), 1:57. Raiders 24–21. **Drive: 13 plays, 97 yards, 5:52.**

**Top passers**

- CHI – Chase Daniel – 22/30, 231 yards, 2 TD, 2 INT
- OAK – Derek Carr – 25/32, 229 yards

**Top rushers**

- CHI – David Montgomery – 11 rushes, 25 yards, TD
- OAK – Josh Jacobs – 26 rushes, 123 yards, 2 TD

**Top receivers**

- CHI – Allen Robinson – 7 receptions, 97 yards, 2 TD
- OAK – Foster Moreau – 4 receptions, 46 yards

The Raiders headed off to England for an international game against the Bears and former Raiders linebacker Khalil Mack, who was traded to Chicago prior to the previous season. Like the previous week, Oakland surged to an early lead, this time behind strong play from Josh Jacobs. Chicago took the lead in the third quarter with 21 unanswered points, but the Raiders eventually answered with a rushing touchdown from Jacobs with just under two minutes left in the game. Oakland's defense intercepted Bears quarterback Chase Daniel on the next drive, then snuffed out a final comeback attempt in the final seconds of the game. With the win, Oakland entered its bye week at 3–2.

==== Week 7: at Green Bay Packers ====
Week 7: Oakland Raiders at Green Bay Packers – Game summary

Quarter	1	2	3	4	Total
Raiders	3	7	7	7	**24**
**Packers**	7	14	14	7	**42**

at Lambeau Field, Green Bay, Wisconsin

- Date: October 20
- Game time: 12:00 p.m. CDT/10:00 a.m. PDT
- Game weather: Sunny, 55 °F (13 °C)
- Game attendance: 78,160
- Referee: Alex Kemp
- TV announcers (CBS): Jim Nantz, Tony Romo and Tracy Wolfson
- Recap, Game Book

Game information

**First quarter**

- OAK – Daniel Carlson 45-yard field goal, 12:25. Raiders 3–0. **Drive: 7 plays, 56 yards, 2:39.**
- GB – Aaron Jones 21-yard pass from Aaron Rodgers (Mason Crosby kick), 9:42. Packers 7–3. **Drive: 6 plays, 75 yards, 2:39.**

**Second quarter**

- OAK – Foster Moreau 10-yard pass from Derek Carr (Daniel Carlson kick), 11:23. Raiders 10–7. **Drive: 14 plays, 86 yards, 8:28.**
- GB – Jamaal Williams 2-yard pass from Aaron Rodgers (Mason Crosby kick), 3:27. Packers 14–10. **Drive: 11 plays, 82 yards, 8:06.**
- GB – Jake Kumerow 37-yard pass from Aaron Rodgers (Mason Crosby kick), 0:12. Packers 21–10. **Drive: 8 plays, 80 yards, 1:37.**

**Third quarter**

- GB – Aaron Rodgers 3-yard run (Mason Crosby kick), 12:04. Packers 28–10. **Drive: 5 plays, 78 yards, 2:56.**
- OAK – Darren Waller 7-yard pass from Derek Carr (Daniel Carlson kick), 6:41. Packers 28–17. **Drive: 11 plays, 75 yards, 5:23.**
- GB – Jimmy Graham 3-yard pass from Aaron Rodgers (Mason Crosby kick), 2:06. Packers 35–17. **Drive: 8 plays, 85 yards, 4:35.**

**Fourth quarter**

- GB – Marquez Valdes-Scantling 74-yard pass from Aaron Rodgers (Mason Crosby kick), 6:28. Packers 42–17. **Drive: 3 plays, 80 yards, 1:41.**
- OAK – Darren Waller 17-yard pass from Mike Glennon (Daniel Carlson kick), 1:32. Packers 42–24. **Drive: 4 plays, 40 yards, 0:37.**

**Top passers**

- OAK – Derek Carr – 22/28, 293 yards, 2 TD, INT
- GB – Aaron Rodgers – 25/31, 429 yards, 5 TD

**Top rushers**

- OAK – Josh Jacobs – 21 rushes, 124 yards
- GB – Aaron Jones – 12 rushes, 50 yards

**Top receivers**

- OAK – Darren Waller – 7 receptions, 126 yards, 2 TD
- GB – Marquez Valdes-Scantling – 2 receptions, 133 yards, TD

==== Week 8: at Houston Texans ====
Week 8: Oakland Raiders at Houston Texans – Game summary

Quarter	1	2	3	4	Total
Raiders	7	7	7	3	**24**
**Texans**	7	3	3	14	**27**

at NRG Stadium, Houston, Texas

- Date: October 27
- Game time: 3:25 p.m. CDT/1:25 p.m. PDT
- Game weather: None (retractable roof closed)
- Game attendance: 71,893
- Referee: Craig Wrolstad
- TV announcers (CBS): Andrew Catalon, James Lofton and A.J. Ross
- Recap, Game Book

Game information

**First quarter**

- OAK – Hunter Renfrow 65-yard pass from Derek Carr (Daniel Carlson kick), 3:40. Raiders 7–0. **Drive: 8 plays, 95 yards, 3:31.**
- HOU – Duke Johnson 12-yard pass from Deshaun Watson (Kaʻimi Fairbairn kick), 1:39. Tied 7–7. **Drive: 6 plays, 75 yards, 2:01.**

**Second quarter**

- OAK – Darren Waller 8-yard pass from Derek Carr (Daniel Carlson kick), 9:36. Raiders 14–7. **Drive: 10 plays, 70 yards, 4:43.**
- HOU – Kaʻimi Fairbairn 33-yard field goal, 1:04. Raiders 14–10. **Drive: 11 plays, 64 yards, 3:38.**

**Third quarter**

- HOU – Kaʻimi Fairbairn 40-yard field goal, 10:28. Raiders 14–13. **Drive: 9 plays, 53 yards, 4:32.**
- OAK – Tyrell Williams 46-yard pass from Derek Carr (Daniel Carlson kick), 7:53. Raiders 21–13. **Drive: 6 plays, 77 yards, 2:35.**

**Fourth quarter**

- HOU – Darren Fells 4-yard pass from Deshaun Watson (Kaʻimi Fairbairn kick), 14:56. Raiders 21–20. **Drive: 15 plays, 77 yards, 7:57.**
- OAK – Daniel Carlson 44-yard field goal, 10:48. Raiders 24–20. **Drive: 9 plays, 50 yards, 4:08.**
- HOU – Darren Fells 9-yard pass from Deshaun Watson (Kaʻimi Fairbairn kick), 6:26. Texans 27–24. **Drive: 9 plays, 75 yards, 4:22.**

**Top passers**

- OAK – Derek Carr – 18/30, 285 yards, 3 TD
- HOU – Deshaun Watson – 27/39, 279 yards, 3 TD

**Top rushers**

- OAK – Josh Jacobs – 15 rushes, 66 yards
- HOU – Carlos Hyde – 19 rushes, 83 yards

**Top receivers**

- OAK – Tyrell Williams – 3 receptions, 91 yards, TD
- HOU – DeAndre Hopkins – 11 receptions, 109 yards

==== Week 9: vs. Detroit Lions ====
Week 9: Detroit Lions at Oakland Raiders – Game summary

Quarter	1	2	3	4	Total
Lions	7	7	3	7	**24**
**Raiders**	7	10	0	14	**31**

at RingCentral Coliseum, Oakland, California

- Date: November 3
- Game time: 1:05 p.m. PST
- Game weather: Sunny, 71 °F (22 °C)
- Game attendance: 53,318
- Referee: Shawn Hochuli
- TV announcers (Fox): Thom Brennaman, Chris Spielman and Shannon Spake
- Recap, Game Book

Game information

**First quarter**

- OAK – Josh Jacobs 2-yard run (Daniel Carlson kick), 6:32. Raiders 7–0. **Drive: 11 plays, 68 yards, 5:32.**
- DET – Marvin Jones 2-yard pass from Matthew Stafford (Matt Prater kick), 2:34. Tied 7–7. **Drive: 9 plays, 75 yards, 3:58.**

**Second quarter**

- OAK – Daniel Carlson 32-yard field goal, 13:31. Raiders 10–7. **Drive: 10 plays, 50 yards, 4:03.**
- DET – Kenny Golladay 59-yard pass from Matthew Stafford (Matt Prater kick), 11:21. Lions 14–10. **Drive: 3 plays, 73 yards, 2:10.**
- OAK – Josh Jacobs 3-yard run (Daniel Carlson kick), 1:12. Raiders 17–14. **Drive: 11 plays, 80 yards, 5:14.**

**Third quarter**

- DET – Matt Prater 23-yard field goal, 4:45. Tied 17–17. **Drive: 11 plays, 60 yards, 6:07.**

**Fourth quarter**

- OAK – Foster Moreau 3-yard pass from Derek Carr (Daniel Carlson kick), 14:52. Raiders 24–17. **Drive: 9 plays, 80 yards, 4:53.**
- DET – J. D. McKissic 26-yard pass from Matthew Stafford (Matt Prater kick), 5:16. Tied 24–24. **Drive: 5 plays, 63 yards, 2:26.**
- OAK – Hunter Renfrow 9-yard pass from Derek Carr (Daniel Carlson kick), 2:04. Raiders 31–24. **Drive: 7 plays, 75 yards, 3:12.**
- DET – Matthew Stafford – 26/41, 406 yards, 3 TD, INT
- OAK – Derek Carr – 20/31, 289 yards, 2 TD

**Top rushers**

- DET – J. D. McKissic – 4 rushes, 32 yards
- OAK – Josh Jacobs – 28 rushes, 120 yards, 2 TD

**Top receivers**

- DET – Kenny Golladay – 4 receptions, 132 yards, TD
- OAK – Jalen Richard – 3 receptions, 56 yards

==== Week 10: vs. Los Angeles Chargers ====
Week 10: Los Angeles Chargers at Oakland Raiders – Game summary

Quarter	1	2	3	4	Total
Chargers	0	14	3	7	**24**
**Raiders**	10	7	3	6	**26**

at RingCentral Coliseum, Oakland, California

- Date: November 7
- Game time: 5:20 p.m. PST
- Game weather: Partly cloudy, 54 °F (12 °C)
- Game attendance: 51,954
- Referee: Walt Anderson
- TV announcers (Fox/NFLN/Amazon Prime): Joe Buck, Troy Aikman, Erin Andrews and Kristina Pink
- Recap, Game Book

Game information

**First quarter**

- OAK – Daniel Carlson 40-yard field goal, 8:01. Raiders 3–0 **Drive: 6 plays, 9 yards, 3:50.**
- OAK – Erik Harris 56-yard interception return (Daniel Carlson kick), 6:02. Raiders 10–0.

**Second quarter**

- LAC – Hunter Henry 2-yard pass from Philip Rivers (Michael Badgley kick), 8:24. Raiders 10–7 **Drive: 16 plays, 77 yards, 8:14.**
- LAC – Melvin Gordon 3-yard run (Michael Badgley kick), 4:14. Chargers 14–10 **Drive: 4 plays, 49 yards, 2:06.**
- OAK – Alec Ingold 9-yard pass from Derek Carr (Daniel Carlson kick), 0:20. Raiders 17–14 **Drive: 10 plays, 76 yards, 3:54.**

**Third quarter**

- OAK – Daniel Carlson 22-yard field goal, 11:33. Raiders 20–14 **Drive: 9 plays, 69 yards, 3:27.**
- LAC – Michael Badgley 27-yard field goal, 0:25. Raiders 20–17 **Drive: 6 plays, 74 yards, 3:31.**

**Fourth quarter**

- LAC – Austin Ekeler 6-yard pass from Phillip Rivers (Michael Badgley kick), 4:02. Chargers 24–20 **Drive: 12 plays, 80 yards, 8:05.**
- OAK – Josh Jacobs 18-yard run (kick failed, wide right), 1:02. Raiders 26–24 **Drive: 10 plays, 75 yards, 3:00.**

**Top passers**

- LAC – Philip Rivers – 17/31, 207 yards, 2 TD, 3 INT
- OAK – Derek Carr – 21/31, 218 yards, TD

**Top rushers**

- LAC – Melvin Gordon – 22 rushes, 108 yards, TD
- OAK – Josh Jacobs – 16 rushes, 71 yards, TD

**Top receivers**

- LAC – Keenan Allen – 8 receptions, 68 yards
- OAK – Jalen Richard – 4 receptions, 43 yards

With the win, the Raiders improved on their 4–12 record from the previous season.

==== Week 11: vs. Cincinnati Bengals ====
Week 11: Cincinnati Bengals at Oakland Raiders – Game summary

Quarter	1	2	3	4	Total
Bengals	7	0	3	0	**10**
**Raiders**	0	14	0	3	**17**

at RingCentral Coliseum, Oakland, California

- Date: November 17
- Game time: 1:25 p.m. PST
- Game weather: Sunny, 76 °F (24 °C)
- Game attendance: 51,921
- Referee: Shawn Smith
- TV announcers (CBS): Greg Gumbel, Trent Green and Melanie Collins
- Recap, Game Book

Game information

**First quarter**

- CIN – Joe Mixon 3-yard run (Randy Bullock kick), 3:03. Bengals 7–0. **Drive: 12 plays, 85 yards, 6:27.**

**Second quarter**

- OAK – Foster Moreau 2-yard pass from Derek Carr (Daniel Carlson kick), 6:50. Tied 7–7. **Drive: 11 plays, 91 yards, 7:07.**
- OAK – Derek Carr 3-yard run (Daniel Carlson kick), 1:37. Raiders 14–7. **Drive: 10 plays, 80 yards, 3:39.**

**Third quarter**

- CIN – Randy Bullock 40-yard field goal, 7:25. Raiders 14–10. **Drive: 5 plays, 23 yards, 1:58.**

**Fourth quarter**

- OAK – Daniel Carlson 20-yard field goal, 9:12. Raiders 17–10. **Drive: 10 plays, 65 yards, 4:20.**

**Top passers**

- CIN – Ryan Finley – 13/31, 115 yards, INT
- OAK – Derek Carr – 25/29, 292 yards, TD, INT

**Top rushers**

- CIN – Joe Mixon – 15 rushes, 86 yards, TD
- OAK – Josh Jacobs – 23 rushes, 112 yards

**Top receivers**

- CIN – Auden Tate – 4 receptions, 56 yards
- OAK – Tyrell Williams – 4 receptions, 82 yards

The win over the Bengals marked the final win for the Raiders in Oakland, as the Raiders lost their last 2 games at the Coliseum.

==== Week 12: at New York Jets ====
Week 12: Oakland Raiders at New York Jets – Game summary

Quarter	1	2	3	4	Total
Raiders	3	0	0	0	**3**
**Jets**	3	10	21	0	**34**

at MetLife Stadium, East Rutherford, New Jersey

- Date: November 24
- Game time: 1:00 p.m. EST/10:00 a.m. PST
- Game weather: Rain, 43 °F (6 °C)
- Game attendance: 78,523
- Referee: Clete Blakeman
- TV announcers (CBS): Greg Gumbel, Trent Green and Melanie Collins
- Recap, Game Book

Game information

**First quarter**

- OAK – Daniel Carlson 48-yard field goal, 9:56. Raiders 3–0. **Drive: 11 plays, 46 yards, 5:04.**
- NYJ – Sam Ficken 24-yard field goal, 5:02. Tied 3–3. **Drive: 10 plays, 69 yards, 4:54.**

**Second quarter**

- NYJ – Sam Darnold 4-yard run (Sam Ficken kick), 10:44. Jets 10–3. **Drive: 12 plays, 96 yards, 7:12.**
- NYJ – Sam Ficken 35-yard field goal, 3:12. Jets 13–3. **Drive: 10 plays, 50 yards, 4:01.**

**Third quarter**

- NYJ – Ryan Griffin 1-yard pass from Sam Darnold (Sam Ficken kick), 12:58. Jets 20–3. **Drive: 4 plays, 81 yards, 2:02.**
- NYJ – Robby Anderson 1-yard pass from San Darnold (Sam Ficken kick), 6:39. Jets 27–3. **Drive: 4 plays, 39 yards, 2:01.**
- NYJ – Brian Poole 15-yard interception return (Sam Ficken kick), 6:25. Jets 34–3.

**Fourth quarter**

- No scoring plays.

**Top passers**

- OAK – Derek Carr – 15/27, 127 yards, INT
- NYJ – Sam Darnold – 20/29, 315 yards, 2 TD

**Top rushers**

- OAK – Josh Jacobs – 10 rushes, 34 yards
- NYJ – Le'Veon Bell – 12 rushes, 49 yards

**Top receivers**

- OAK – Jalen Richard – 6 receptions, 47 yards
- NYJ – Robby Anderson – 4 receptions, 86 yards, TD

==== Week 13: at Kansas City Chiefs ====
Week 13: Oakland Raiders at Kansas City Chiefs – Game summary

Quarter	1	2	3	4	Total
Raiders	0	0	0	9	**9**
**Chiefs**	7	14	10	9	**40**

at Arrowhead Stadium, Kansas City, Missouri

- Date: December 1
- Game time: 3:25 p.m. CST/1:25 p.m. PST
- Game weather: Cloudy, 36 °F (2 °C)
- Game attendance: 73,548
- Referee: John Hussey
- TV announcers (CBS): Jim Nantz, Tony Romo and Tracy Wolfson
- Recap, Game Book

Game information

**First quarter**

- KC – Darrel Williams 3-yard pass from Patrick Mahomes (Harrison Butker kick), 7:26. Chiefs 7–0. **Drive: 11 plays, 47 yards, 3:31.**

**Second quarter**

- KC – Patrick Mahomes 13-yard run (Harrison Butker kick), 6:28. Chiefs 14–0. **Drive: 8 plays, 60 yards, 3:25.**
- KC – Juan Thornhill 46-yard interception return (Harrison Butker kick), 3:42. Chiefs 21–0.

**Third quarter**

- KC – Harrison Butker 50-yard field goal, 12:03. Chiefs 24–0. **Drive: 9 plays, 34 yards, 2:57.**
- KC – LeSean McCoy 3-yard run (Harrison Butker kick), 6:51. Chiefs 31–0. **Drive: 4 plays, 64 yards, 2:15.**

**Fourth quarter**

- OAK – Daniel Carlson 34-yard field goal, 14:56. Chiefs 31–3. **Drive: 13 plays, 60 yards, 6:55.**
- KC – Darwin Thompson 4-yard run (Harrison Butker kick), 5:24. Chiefs 38–3. **Drive: 14 plays, 75 yards, 9:32.**
- OAK – Derek Carrier 4-yard pass from Derek Carr, 0:39. Chiefs 38–9. **Drive: 10 plays, 75 yards, 4:45.**
- KC – Charvarius Ward defensive two-point conversion, 0:39. Chiefs 40–9.

**Top passers**

- OAK – Derek Carr – 20/30, 222 yards, TD, 2 INT
- KC – Patrick Mahomes – 15/29, 175 yards, TD

**Top rushers**

- OAK – Josh Jacobs – 17 rushes, 104 yards
- KC – Darwin Thompson – 11 rushes, 44 yards, TD

**Top receivers**

- OAK – Darren Waller – 7 receptions, 100 yards
- KC – Travis Kelce – 5 receptions, 90 yards

==== Week 14: vs. Tennessee Titans ====
Week 14: Tennessee Titans at Oakland Raiders – Game summary

Quarter	1	2	3	4	Total
**Titans**	7	14	7	14	**42**
Raiders	7	14	0	0	**21**

at RingCentral Coliseum, Oakland, California

- Date: December 8
- Game time: 1:25 p.m. PST
- Game weather: Cloudy, 59 °F (15 °C)
- Game attendance: 52,760
- Referee: Brad Allen
- TV announcers (CBS): Greg Gumbel, Trent Green and Melanie Collins
- Recap, Game Book

Game information

**First quarter**

- OAK – DeAndre Washington 14-yard run (Daniel Carlson kick), 7:43. Raiders 7–0. **Drive: 3 plays, 24 yards, 1:17.**
- TEN – Derrick Henry 12-yard run (Ryan Succop kick), 3:21. Tied 7–7. **Drive: 8 plays, 74 yards, 4:22.**

**Second quarter**

- TEN – A. J. Brown 91-yard pass from Ryan Tannehill (Ryan Succop kick), 14:04. Titans 14–7. **Drive: 1 plays, 91 yards, 0:12.**
- OAK – Rico Gafford 49-yard pass from Derek Carr (Daniel Carlson kick), 10:43. Tied 14–14. **Drive: 6 plays, 75 yards, 3:21.**
- TEN – A.J. Brown 16-yard pass from Ryan Tannehill (Ryan Succop kick), 6:52. Titans 21–14. **Drive: 8 plays, 77 yards, 3:51.**
- OAK – Foster Moreau 1-yard pass from Derek Carr (Daniel Carlson kick), 0:24. Tied 21–21. **Drive: 14 plays, 71 yards, 6:28.**

**Third quarter**

- TEN – Derrick Henry 10-yard run (Ryan Succop kick), 5:36. Titans 28–21. **Drive: 6 plays, 89 yards, 2:28.**

**Fourth quarter**

- TEN – Jonnu Smith 17-yard pass from Ryan Tannehill (Ryan Succop kick), 14:29. Titans 35–21. **Drive: 9 plays, 84 yards, 3:53.**
- TEN – Jayon Brown 46-yard fumble return (Ryan Succop kick), 13:12. Titans 42–21.

**Top passers**

- TEN – Ryan Tannehill – 21/27, 391 yards, 3 TD, INT
- OAK – Derek Carr – 25/34, 263 yards, 2 TD

**Top rushers**

- TEN – Derrick Henry – 18 rushes, 103 yards, 2 TD
- OAK – DeAndre Washington – 14 rushes, 53 yards, TD

**Top receivers**

- TEN – A. J. Brown – 5 receptions, 153 yards, 2 TD
- OAK – Darren Waller – 6 receptions, 73 yards

==== Week 15: vs. Jacksonville Jaguars ====
Week 15: Jacksonville Jaguars at Oakland Raiders – Game summary

Quarter	1	2	3	4	Total
**Jaguars**	3	0	3	14	**20**
Raiders	10	6	0	0	**16**

at RingCentral Coliseum, Oakland, California

- Date: December 15
- Game time: 1:05 p.m. PST
- Game weather: Sunny, 59 °F (15 °C)
- Game attendance: 52,788
- Referee: Brad Rogers
- TV announcers (CBS): Kevin Harlan, Rich Gannon and John Schriffen
- Recap, Game Book

Game information

**First quarter**

- OAK – Tyrell Williams 40-yard pass from Derek Carr (Daniel Carlson kick), 11:29. Raiders 7–0. **Drive: 7 plays, 75 yards, 3:31.**
- JAX – Josh Lambo 28-yard field goal, 8:09. Raiders 7–3. **Drive: 7 plays, 65 yards, 3:20.**
- OAK – Daniel Carlson 33-yard field goal, 4:53. Raiders 10–3. **Drive: 8 plays, 60 yards, 3:16.**

**Second quarter**

- OAK – Daniel Carlson 34-yard field goal, 2:21. Raiders 13–3. **Drive: 9 plays, 35 yards, 3:34.**
- OAK – Daniel Carlson 27-yard field goal, 0:02. Raiders 16–3. **Drive: 8 plays, 69 yards, 1:17.**

**Third quarter**

- JAX – Josh Lambo 43-yard field goal, 0:28. Raiders 16–6. **Drive: 15 plays, 59 yards, 8:21.**

**Fourth quarter**

- JAX – Chris Conley 6-yard pass from Gardner Minshew (Josh Lambo kick), 5:15. Raiders 16–13. **Drive: 11 plays, 79 yards, 5:54.**
- JAX – Chris Conley 4-yard pass from Gardner Minshew (Josh Lambo kick), 0:31. Jaguars 20–16. **Drive: 7 plays, 65 yards, 1:13.**

**Top passers**

- JAX – Gardner Minshew – 17/29, 201 yards, 2 TD
- OAK – Derek Carr – 22/36, 267 yards, TD

**Top rushers**

- JAX – Leonard Fournette – 15 rushes, 42 yards
- OAK – Josh Jacobs – 24 rushes, 89 yards

**Top receivers**

- JAX – Keelan Cole – 3 receptions, 76 yards
- OAK – Darren Waller – 7 receptions, 112 yards

Despite holding a 16–6 lead late in the fourth quarter, Oakland allowed a touchdown pass from Jaguars quarterback Gardner Minshew to Chris Conley, then failed to run out the clock and missed the subsequent field goal attempt. Jacksonville would capitalize on the ensuing drive as Minshew and Conley connected again for a game-winning touchdown. This was the Raiders' final game played in Oakland before relocating to Las Vegas for the 2020 season. Fans booed the team as they exited the field for the last time. With their fourth straight loss, the Raiders fell to 6–8, but remained in the playoff hunt as the Pittsburgh Steelers would lose later that night.

==== Week 16: at Los Angeles Chargers ====
Week 16: Oakland Raiders at Los Angeles Chargers – Game summary

Quarter	1	2	3	4	Total
**Raiders**	7	7	7	3	**24**
Chargers	0	7	7	3	**17**

at Dignity Health Sports Park, Carson, California

- Date: December 22
- Game time: 1:05 p.m. PST
- Game weather: Partly cloudy, 64 °F (18 °C)
- Game attendance: 25,380
- Referee: Clay Martin
- TV announcers (CBS): Greg Gumbel, Trent Green and Melanie Collins
- Recap, Game Book

Game information

**First quarter**

- OAK – Hunter Renfrow 56-yard pass from Derek Carr (Daniel Carlson kick), 10:57. Raiders 7–0. **Drive: 4 plays, 71 yards, 1:48.**

**Second quarter**

- LAC – Melvin Gordon 1-yard run (Michael Badgley kick), 1:54. Tied 7–7. **Drive: 8 plays, 78 yards, 3:58.**
- OAK – Derek Carr 3-yard run (Daniel Carlson kick), 0:08. Raiders 14–7. **Drive: 11 plays, 75 yards, 1:46.**

**Third quarter**

- OAK – DeAndre Washington 5-yard run (Daniel Carlson kick), 6:11. Raiders 21–7. **Drive: 13 plays, 75 yards, 8:49.**
- LAC – Melvin Gordon 1-yard run (Michael Badgley kick), 1:04. Raiders 21–14. **Drive: 10 plays, 83 yards, 5:07.**

**Fourth quarter**

- OAK – Daniel Carlson 48-yard field goal, 8:28. Raiders 24–14. **Drive: 12 plays, 48 yards, 7:36.**
- LAC – Michael Badgley 27-yard field goal, 1:29. Raiders 24–17. **Drive: 13 plays, 81 yards, 2:03.**

**Top passers**

- OAK – Derek Carr – 26/30, 291 yards, TD
- LAC – Philip Rivers – 27/39, 279 yards

**Top rushers**

- OAK – DeAndre Washington – 23 rushes, 85 yards, TD
- LAC – Melvin Gordon – 9 rushes, 15 yards, 2 TD

**Top receivers**

- OAK – Hunter Renfrow – 7 receptions, 107 yards, TD
- LAC – Keenan Allen – 5 receptions, 71 yards

This was the Chargers' final home game at Dignity Health Sports Park before moving into their new stadium in the 2020 season. This was also the last time the Raiders and Chargers faced each other—home or away—prior to the Raiders' relocation to Las Vegas in 2020. As a result, this was the last meeting against the two rivals as California-based franchises. This also turned out to be the Raiders final win as the "Oakland Raiders". With the win, the Raiders snapped their 4-game losing streak, improving to 7–8 and keeping their slim playoff hopes alive.

==== Week 17: at Denver Broncos ====
Week 17: Oakland Raiders at Denver Broncos – Game summary

Quarter	1	2	3	4	Total
Raiders	0	3	0	12	**15**
**Broncos**	0	10	3	3	**16**

at Empower Field at Mile High, Denver, Colorado

- Date: December 29
- Game time: 2:25 p.m. MST/1:25 p.m. PST
- Game weather: Sunny, 31 °F (−1 °C)
- Game attendance: 76,334
- Referee: Shawn Smith
- TV announcers (CBS): Andrew Catalon and James Lofton
- Recap, Game Book

Game information

**First quarter**

- No scoring plays.

**Second quarter**

- OAK – Daniel Carlson 23-yard field goal, 14:06. Raiders 3–0. **Drive: 8 plays, 88 yards, 4:36.**
- DEN – Brandon McManus 43-yard field goal, 8:21. Tied 3–3. **Drive: 11 plays, 50 yards, 5:45.**
- DEN – Andrew Beck 1-yard pass from Drew Lock (Brandon McManus kick), 0:28. Broncos 10–3. **Drive: 5 plays, 41 yards, 0:43.**

**Third quarter**

- DEN – Brandon McManus 49-yard field goal, 4:37. Broncos 13–3. **Drive: 11 plays, 58 yards, 4:34.**

**Fourth quarter**

- DEN – Brandon McManus 51-yard field goal, 14:55. Broncos 16–3. **Drive: 6 plays, 27 yards, 3:01.**
- OAK – Daniel Carlson 33-yard field goal, 9:03. Broncos 16–6. **Drive: 12 plays, 60 yards, 5:52.**
- OAK – Daniel Carlson 28-yard field goal, 3:09. Broncos 16–9. **Drive: 3 plays, 5 yards, 0:24.**
- OAK – Hunter Renfrow 3-yard pass from Derek Carr (pass failed), 0:07. Broncos 16–15. **Drive: 8 plays, 53 yards, 1:34.**

**Top passers**

- OAK – Derek Carr – 29/46, 391 yards, TD
- DEN – Drew Lock – 17/28, 177 yards, TD

**Top rushers**

- OAK – DeAndre Washington – 17 rushes, 77 yards
- DEN – Phillip Lindsay – 18 rushes, 53 yards

**Top receivers**

- OAK – Darren Waller – 6 receptions, 107 yards
- DEN – DaeSean Hamilton – 5 receptions, 65 yards

=== Standings ===
==== Division ====
AFC West
	W	L	T	PCT	DIV	CONF	PF	PA	STK
^{(2)} Kansas City Chiefs	12	4	0	.750	6–0	9–3	451	308	W6
Denver Broncos	7	9	0	.438	3–3	6–6	282	316	W2
Oakland Raiders	7	9	0	.438	3–3	5–7	313	419	L1
Los Angeles Chargers	5	11	0	.313	0–6	3–9	337	345	L3

==== Conference ====
AFC
#	Team	Division	W	L	T	PCT	DIV	CONF	SOS	SOV	STK
**Division leaders**
1	Baltimore Ravens	North	14	2	0	.875	5–1	10–2	.494	.484	W12
2 (Note: Kansas City claimed the No. 2 seed over New England based on head-to-head victory.)	Kansas City Chiefs	West	12	4	0	.750	6–0	9–3	.510	.477	W6
3	New England Patriots	East	12	4	0	.750	5–1	8–4	.469	.411	L1
4	Houston Texans	South	10	6	0	.625	4–2	8–4	.520	.488	L1
**Wild Cards**
5	Buffalo Bills	East	10	6	0	.625	3–3	7–5	.461	.363	L2
6	Tennessee Titans	South	9	7	0	.563	3–3	7–5	.488	.465	W1
**Did not qualify for the postseason**
7	Pittsburgh Steelers	North	8	8	0	.500	3–3	6–6	.502	.324	L3
8 (Note: Denver finished ahead of Indianapolis and NY Jets based on conference record. Division tiebreak was initially used to eliminate Oakland (see below).) (Note: Denver finished ahead of Oakland based on conference record.)	Denver Broncos	West	7	9	0	.438	3–3	6–6	.510	.406	W2
9 (Note: Oakland and Indianapolis finished ahead of NY Jets based on conference record.) (Note: Oakland finished ahead of Indianapolis based on head-to-head victory.)	Oakland Raiders	West	7	9	0	.438	3–3	5–7	.482	.335	L1
10	Indianapolis Colts	South	7	9	0	.438	3–3	5–7	.492	.500	L1
11	New York Jets	East	7	9	0	.438	2–4	4–8	.473	.402	W2
12 (Note: Jacksonville finished ahead of Cleveland based on record against common opponents. Jacksonville's cumulative record against Cincinnati, Denver, NY Jets, and Tennessee was 4–1, compared to Cleveland's 2–3 cumulative record against the same four teams.)	Jacksonville Jaguars	South	6	10	0	.375	2–4	6–6	.484	.406	W1
13	Cleveland Browns	North	6	10	0	.375	3–3	6–6	.533	.479	L3
14 (Note: LA Chargers finished ahead of Miami based on head-to-head victory.)	Los Angeles Chargers	West	5	11	0	.313	0–6	3–9	.514	.488	L3
15	Miami Dolphins	East	5	11	0	.313	2–4	4–8	.484	.463	W2
16	Cincinnati Bengals	North	2	14	0	.125	1–5	2–10	.553	.406	W1
**Tiebreakers** (Note: When breaking ties for three or more teams under the NFL's rules, they are first broken within divisions, then comparing only the highest ranked remaining team from each division.)
