= Erik Harris =

American football player (born 1990)

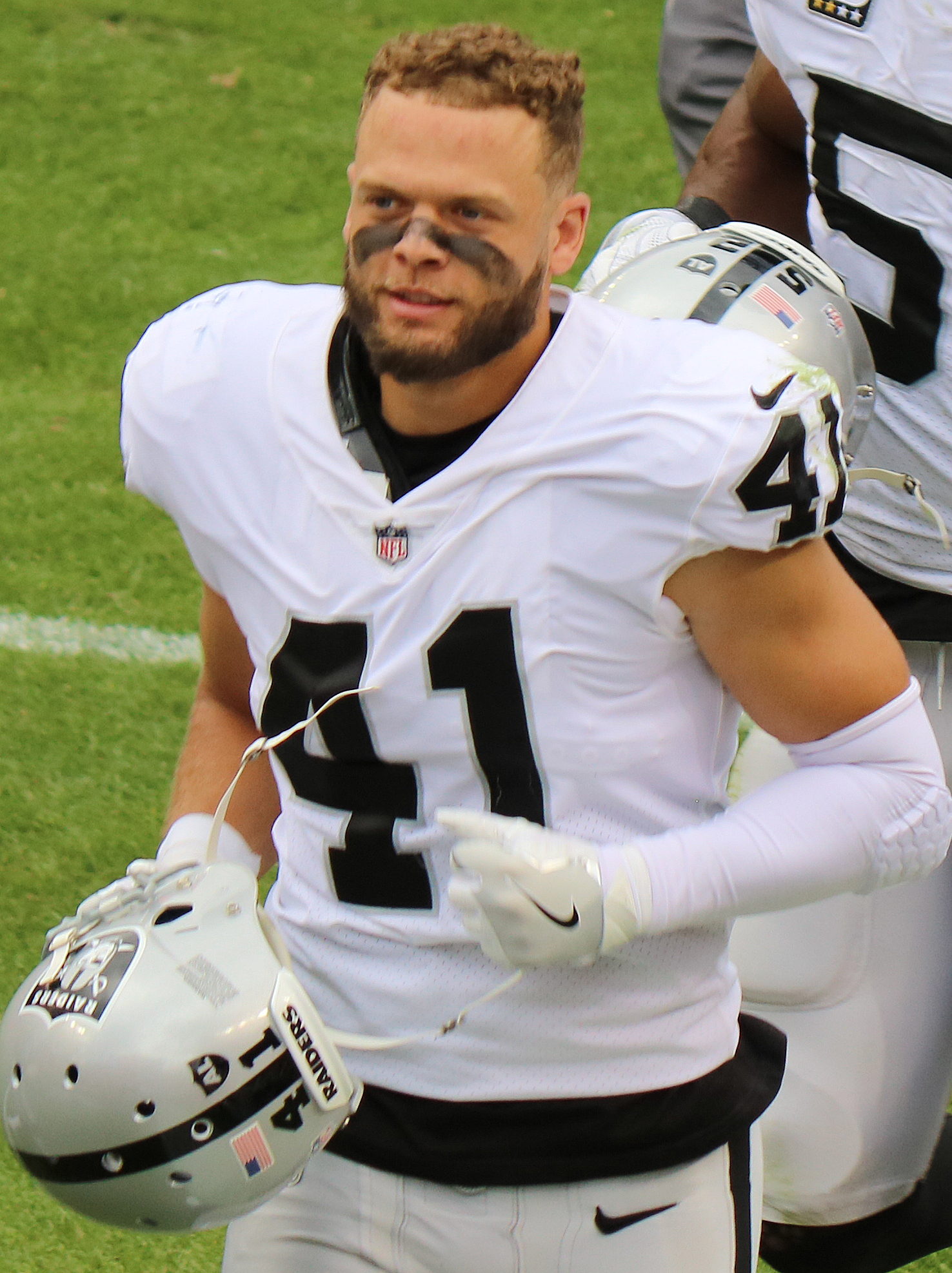
- Harris with the Oakland Raiders in 2017

No. 41, 30, 25, 23, 35
- Position: Safety

Personal information
- Born: April 2, 1990 (age 36); Los Angeles, California, U.S.
- Listed height: 6 ft 2 in (1.88 m)
- Listed weight: 225 lb (102 kg)

Career information
- High school: New Oxford (New Oxford, Pennsylvania)
- College: California (PA) (2008–2011)
- NFL draft: 2012: undrafted

Career history

Playing
- Hamilton Tiger-Cats (2013–2015); New Orleans Saints (2016); Oakland / Las Vegas Raiders (2017–2020); Atlanta Falcons (2021–2022); San Francisco 49ers (2023)

Coaching
- Gulf Breeze (FL) (2025–present) Head coach

Career NFL statistics
- Total tackles: 267
- Forced fumbles: 1
- Pass deflections: 28
- Interceptions: 5
- Defensive touchdowns: 2
- Stats at Pro Football Reference
- Stats at CFL.ca (archive)

Erik Harris (born April 2, 1990) is an American former professional football player who was a safety in the National Football League (NFL) and Canadian Football League (CFL). He played college football for the California Vulcans. He was a member of the Hamilton Tiger-Cats of the CFL, and the New Orleans Saints, Oakland / Las Vegas Raiders, Atlanta Falcons, and San Francisco 49ers of the NFL. Harris is known for playing many positions, including free and strong safety, halfback (which has an entirely different meaning than the American football halfback), cornerback, weakside linebacker and strong-side linebacker.

== Early life ==
Harris was born in Los Angeles, California. When Harris was two months old, his parents separated and he moved to Baltimore with his mother. Harris and his mother moved to Pennsylvania when he was in the fifth grade. He attended New Oxford High School in New Oxford, Pennsylvania.

He attended California University of Pennsylvania, playing safety for the Division II California Vulcans football team. In four college seasons, he made 231 tackles on defense. He was a First-team All-Pennsylvania State Athletic Conference (PSAC) selection in 2010. He was a Second-team All-PSAC selection in 2011.

== Professional career ==
=== Pre-draft ===
Harris was rated the 90th best strong safety in the 2012 NFL draft by NFLDraftScout.com. Harris was not drafted.

Pre-draft measurables
Height	Weight	40-yard dash	10-yard split	20-yard split	20-yard shuttle	Three-cone drill	Vertical jump	Broad jump	Bench press
6 ft 1 7/8 in (1.88 m)	226 lb (103 kg)	4.57 s	1.65 s	2.70 s	4.48 s	6.96 s	31.5 in (0.80 m)	9 ft 2 in (2.79 m)	23 reps
All values from California (PA) Pro Day

=== Hamilton Tiger-Cats ===
Harris was signed by the Hamilton Tiger-Cats on April 11, 2013. He played in 45 games for Hamilton, making 79 defensive tackles and 27 special teams tackles. He caught a touchdown on offense and recorded three interceptions.

=== New Orleans Saints ===
On February 2, 2016, the New Orleans Saints signed Harris to a reserve/future contract after a recommendation by Delvin Breaux, who had played with him while on the Tiger-Cats. Harris agreed to a three-year, $1.62 million contract. Joel Erickson of The Advocate noted that Harris was a CFL linebacker but that he had the ability to play as an NFL defensive back. After former Saints safety Rafael Bush signed with the Detroit Lions, New Orleans announced that Harris would play safety. On October 10, 2016, Harris sustained a torn ACL during practice and was placed on the injured reserve list October 13, 2016. He finished his rookie campaign with one solo tackle in four games.

Throughout training camp in 2017, Harris competed to be the starting free safety against Vonn Bell and Rafael Bush after the role was left vacant by the departure of Jairus Byrd. On September 2, 2017, the New Orleans Saints waived Harris.

=== Oakland / Las Vegas Raiders ===
==== 2017 season ====
On September 5, 2017, the Oakland Raiders signed Harris to a one-year, $630,000 contract. Harris was initially signed to provide depth after rookie Obi Melifonwu was placed on injured reserve. Head coach Jack Del Rio named Harris the primary backup free safety, behind Karl Joseph, to start the 2017 regular season. Harris appeared in 15 games in 2017, primarily on special teams, and finished the season with five combined tackles (four solo).

==== 2018 season ====
Harris entered training camp as a backup safety and competed to be a primary backup against Obi Melifonwu, Marcus Gilchrist, Shalom Luani, Dallin Leavitt and Tevin Mitchel. Head coach Jon Gruden names Harris the primary backup strong safety, behind Karl Joseph, to begin the 2018 NFL season. On October 28, 2018, Harris earned his first career start and recorded a season-high six solo tackles during a 42–28 loss against the Indianapolis Colts. In Week 14, he collected a season-high eight combined tackles (four solo) as the Raiders defeated the Pittsburgh Steelers 24–21. On December 16, 2018, Harris recorded three solo tackles, deflected two passes, and made his first career interception during a 30–16 loss at the Cincinnati Bengals. Harris made his first career interception off a pass by Bengals' quarterback Jeff Driskel, that was originally intended for John Ross. Harris made 49 combined tackles (36 solo), seven pass deflections, and two interceptions in 16 games and four starts.

==== 2019 season ====
On March 8, 2019, the Raiders signed Harris to a two-year, $5 million contract that included $1.07 million guaranteed. Harris entered training camp slated as a backup safety after the Raiders drafted Johnathan Abram in the first round. Head coach Jon Gruden retained Harris as the primary backup strong safety, behind Karl Joseph, to start the season.

Harris became the starting free safety in Week 2 after Johnathan Abram was placed on injured reserve after tearing his rotator cuff during the Raiders' season-opening 24–16 victory against the Denver Broncos. In Week 2, Harris earned his first career start and recorded two solo tackles during a 28–10 loss against the Kansas City Chiefs. On September 29, 2019, Harris made seven combined tackles (six solo), a pass deflection, and returned his first career interception for a touchdown during a 31–24 win at the Colts. Harris intercepted a pass attempt by Jacoby Brissett, that was intended for wide receiver Zach Pascal, and returned it for a 30-yard touchdown during the fourth quarter. On November 7, 2019, Harris made one tackle and intercepted two passes by Chargers' quarterback Philip Rivers during a 26–24 victory against the Los Angeles Chargers on Thursday Night Football. Harris intercepted a pass that was intended for tight end Hunter Henry for a 56-yard touchdown during the first quarter. He finished the 2019 NFL season with 68 combined tackles (59 solo), eight pass deflections, three interceptions, and two touchdowns in 16 games and 14 starts.

==== 2020 season ====
Harris was placed on the reserve/COVID-19 list by the Raiders on December 21, 2020, and activated on January 1, 2021.

=== Atlanta Falcons ===
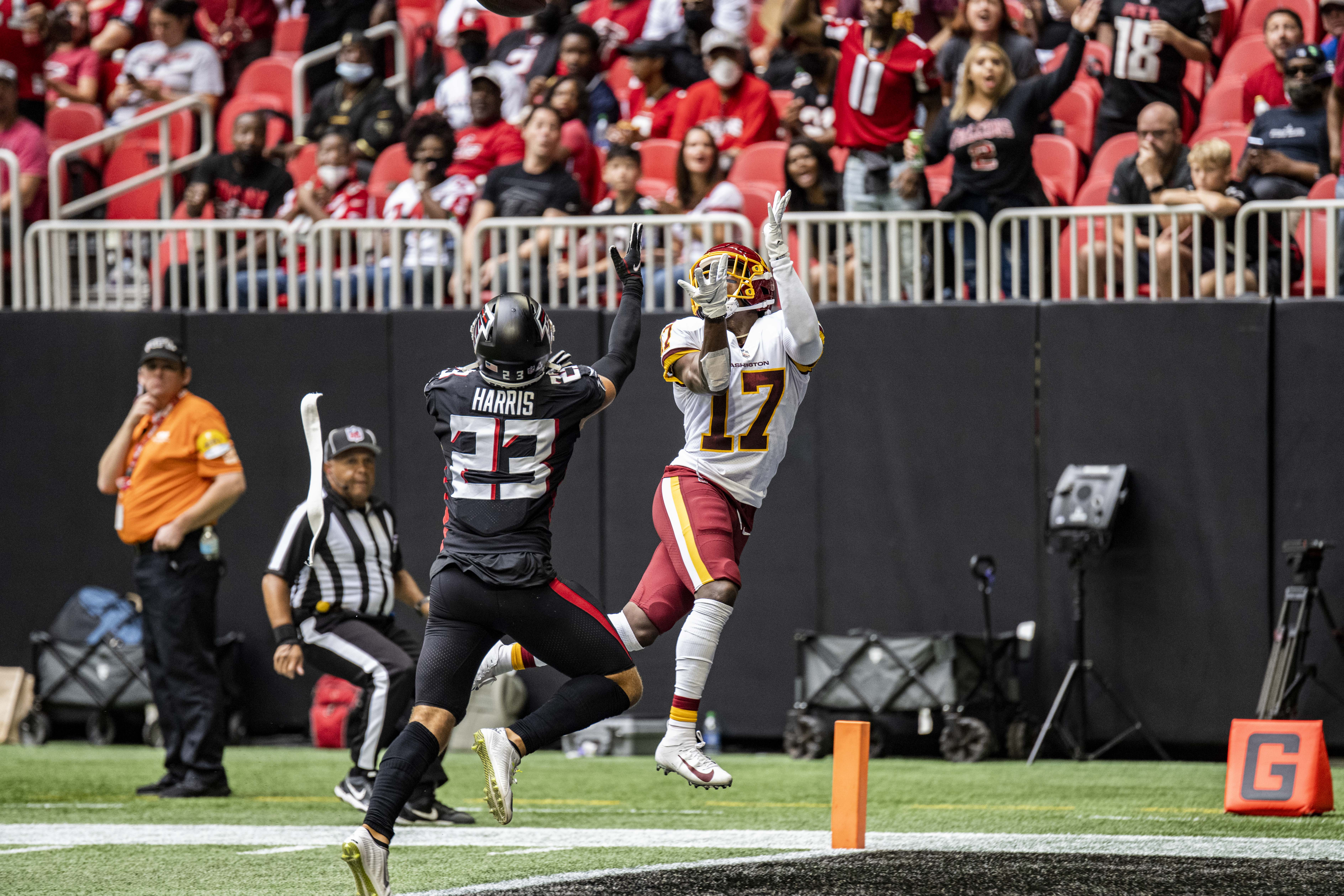
Harris covering Washington Football Team wide receiver, Terry McLaurin, in 2021.

On March 19, 2021, Harris signed a one-year contract with the Atlanta Falcons. He entered the 2021 season as the Falcons' starting free safety. Harris suffered a torn pectoral in Week 14 and was placed on season-ending injured reserve. He finished the season with 64 tackles and eight passes defensed through 12 starts.

On March 25, 2022, Harris re-signed with the Falcons on a one-year contract.

=== San Francisco 49ers ===
On November 28, 2023, Harris was signed to the practice squad of the San Francisco 49ers. He signed a reserve/future contract with San Francisco on February 13, 2024. He was released by the 49ers on August 7.

== Coaching career ==
On June 30, 2025, Harris was hired to serve as the head football coach at Gulf Breeze High School in Gulf Breeze, Florida.

== NFL career statistics ==
Legend
**Bold**	Career high

Year	Team	Games		Tackles					Interceptions					Fumbles			
Year	Team	GP	GS	Cmb	Solo	Ast	Sck	TFL	Int	Yds	TD	Lng	PD	FF	FR	Yds	TD
2016	NOR	4	0	1	1	0	0.0	0	0	0	0	0	0	0	0	0	0
2017	OAK	15	0	5	4	1	0.0	0	0	0	0	0	0	0	0	0	0
2018	OAK	**16**	4	49	36	13	0.0	2	2	22	0	21	7	0	0	0	0
2019	OAK	**16**	**14**	**74**	**64**	10	0.0	1	**3**	**145**	**2**	**59**	**8**	0	0	0	0
2020	LVR	14	12	61	44	17	0.0	1	0	0	0	0	5	**1**	0	0	0
2021	ATL	12	12	64	46	**18**	**0.5**	**3**	0	0	0	0	**8**	0	0	0	0
2022	ATL	14	1	13	7	6	0.0	0	0	0	0	0	0	0	0	0	0
2023	SFO	3	0	0	0	0	0.0	0	0	0	0	0	0	0	0	0	0
		94	43	267	202	65	0.5	7	5	167	2	59	28	1	0	0	0

== Personal life ==
Harris is married to Theresa Harris, whom he met in New Oxford High School. They have four children: Ellis, Esme, and twin sons, Isaiah and Elijah, who were born in the summer of 2013. As of July 2025 he is the head coach for the Gulf Breeze High School football team in Gulf Breeze Florida.
