= New Oxford, Pennsylvania =

Borough in Pennsylvania, US

New Oxford, Pennsylvania Providence
- Borough
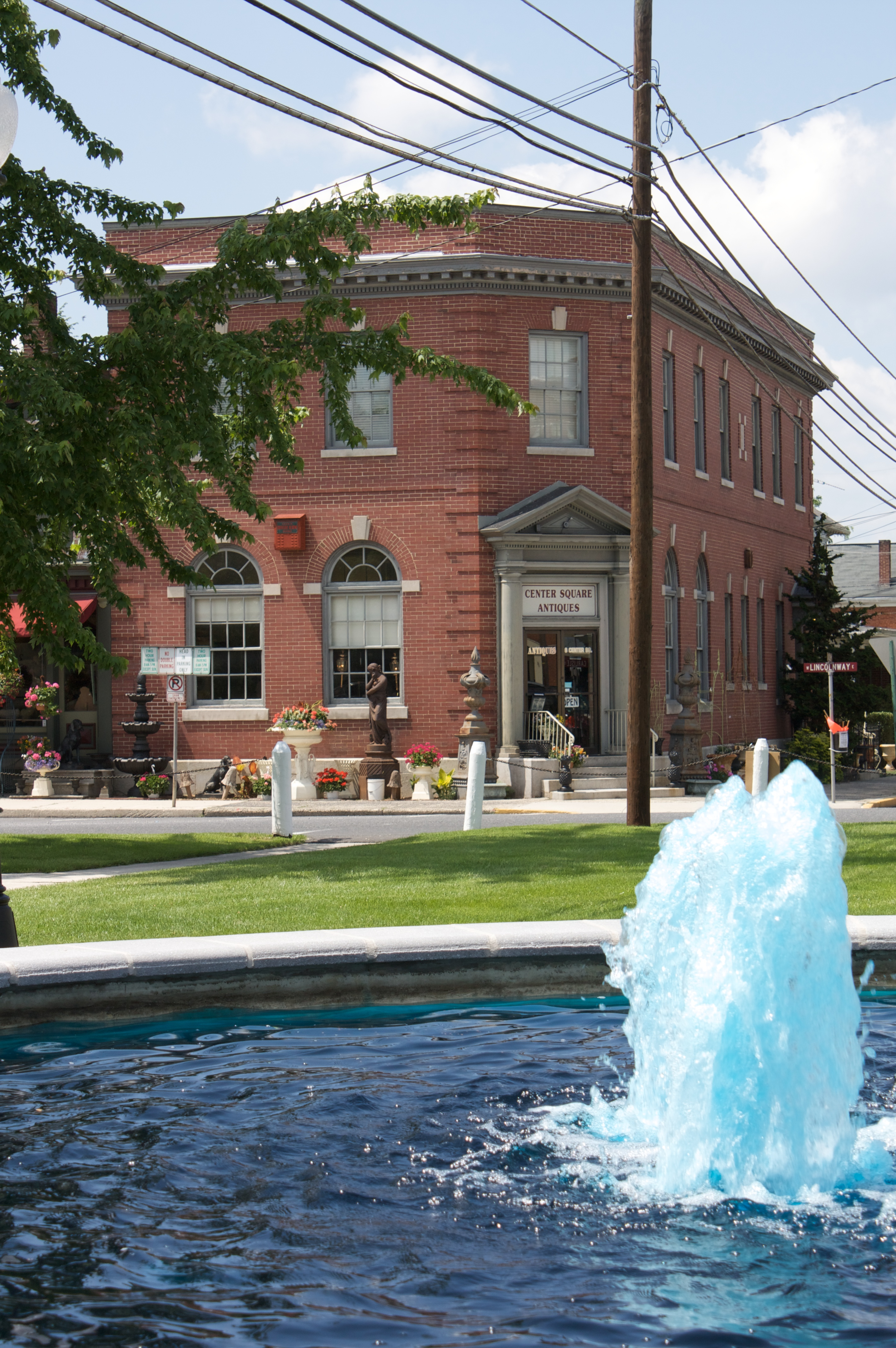
- Downtown New Oxford

- Seal
- Nickname: Oxfordtown
- Location in Adams County and the U.S. state of Pennsylvania.

- Location in Pennsylvania and the United States New Oxford (the United States)
- Coordinates: 39°51′48″N 77°03′23″W
- Country: United States
- State: Pennsylvania
- County: Adams
- Settled: 1792
- Incorporated: 1874

Government
  - Type: Borough Council

Area
  - Total: 0.62 sq mi (1.60 km^{2})
  - Land: 0.62 sq mi (1.60 km^{2})
  - Water: 0 sq mi (0.00 km^{2})
- Elevation: 558 ft (170 m)

Population (2020)
  - Total: 1,868
  - Density: 3,017.7/sq mi (1,165.13/km^{2})
- Time zone: UTC-5 (Eastern (EST))
  - Summer (DST): UTC-4 (EDT)
- Zip Code: 17350
- Area code: 717
- FIPS code: 42-53920
- Website: https://newoxfordborough.org/

New Oxford is a borough in Adams County, Pennsylvania, United States. The population was 1,868 at the 2020 census.

== Geography ==
New Oxford is located at 39°51′48″N 77°3′23″W (39.863208, -77.056475).

According to the United States Census Bureau, the borough has a total area of 0.6 square miles (1.6 km^{2}), all land.

== History ==
New Oxford was originally platted in 1792 for Henry Kuhn by James Bolton and identified as "Oxford town" due to the presence of a nearby stream ford and a local establishment named "Dutch Frederick's stand" with the head of an ox on the front of the building. This was changed again in 1822 by the town's first postmaster, Dr. Pfeiffer to "New Oxford". New Oxford was incorporated as borough on August 20, 1874, and Joseph S. Gitt was elected as its first president and then served as secretary through 1891. In 1886, the population was 209, with 67 horses, 40 cattle, 65 "pleasure carriages", and 14 gold watches.

== Demographics ==
Historical population
Census	Pop.	Note	%±
1840	225		—
1880	501		—
1890	585		16.8%
1900	663		13.3%
1910	838		26.4%
1920	949		13.2%
1930	1,138		19.9%
1940	1,194		4.9%
1950	1,366		14.4%
1960	1,407		3.0%
1970	1,495		6.3%
1980	1,921		28.5%
1990	1,617		−15.8%
2000	1,696		4.9%
2010	1,783		5.1%
2020	1,868		4.8%

As of the census of 2000, there were 1,696 people, 678 households, and 448 families residing in the borough. The population density was 2,700.7 inhabitants per square mile (1,042.7/km^{2}). There were 725 housing units at an average density of 1,154.5 per square mile (445.8/km^{2}). The racial makeup of the borough was 92.45% White, 1.36% African American, 0.24% Native American, 0.18% Asian, 0.18% Pacific Islander, 4.42% from other races, and 1.18% from two or more races. Hispanic or Latino of any race were 8.96% of the population.

There were 678 households, out of which 33.0% had children under the age of 18 living with them, 47.1% were married couples living together, 13.0% had a female householder with no husband present, and 33.8% were non-families. 27.7% of all households were made up of individuals, and 10.0% had someone living alone who was 65 years of age or older. The average household size was 2.50 and the average family size was 3.05.

In the borough the population was spread out, with 26.6% under the age of 18, 9.3% from 18 to 24, 30.3% from 25 to 44, 20.7% from 45 to 64, and 13.1% who were 65 years of age or older. The median age was 35 years. For every 100 females there were 99.1 males. For every 100 females age 18 and over, there were 98.6 males.

The median income for a household in the borough was $36,991, and the median income for a family was $43,036. Males had a median income of $30,203 versus $22,455 for females. The per capita income for the borough was $18,065. About 7.3% of families and 7.6% of the population were below the poverty line, including 10.0% of those under age 18 and 4.4% of those age 65 or over.

== Economy ==
Within New Oxford are several large manufacturing plants. Among these are Sandridge Crafted Foods, which manufactures products such as soups; Yazoo Mills, which manufactures paper products; Pilgrim's Pride, which processes turkeys; and Aero Energy, which refurbishes propane and CO_{2} containers for Blue Rhino. The Chamber of Commerce sponsors an annual antiques and crafts show on the third Saturday in June.

== Education ==
It is in the Conewago Valley School District.

== Notable people ==
- Erik Harris, NFL safety for the Oakland Raiders and a 2008 graduate of New Oxford High School
- Thomas Haugh, basketball player for the Florida Gators
