= Foster Moreau =

American football player (born 1997)

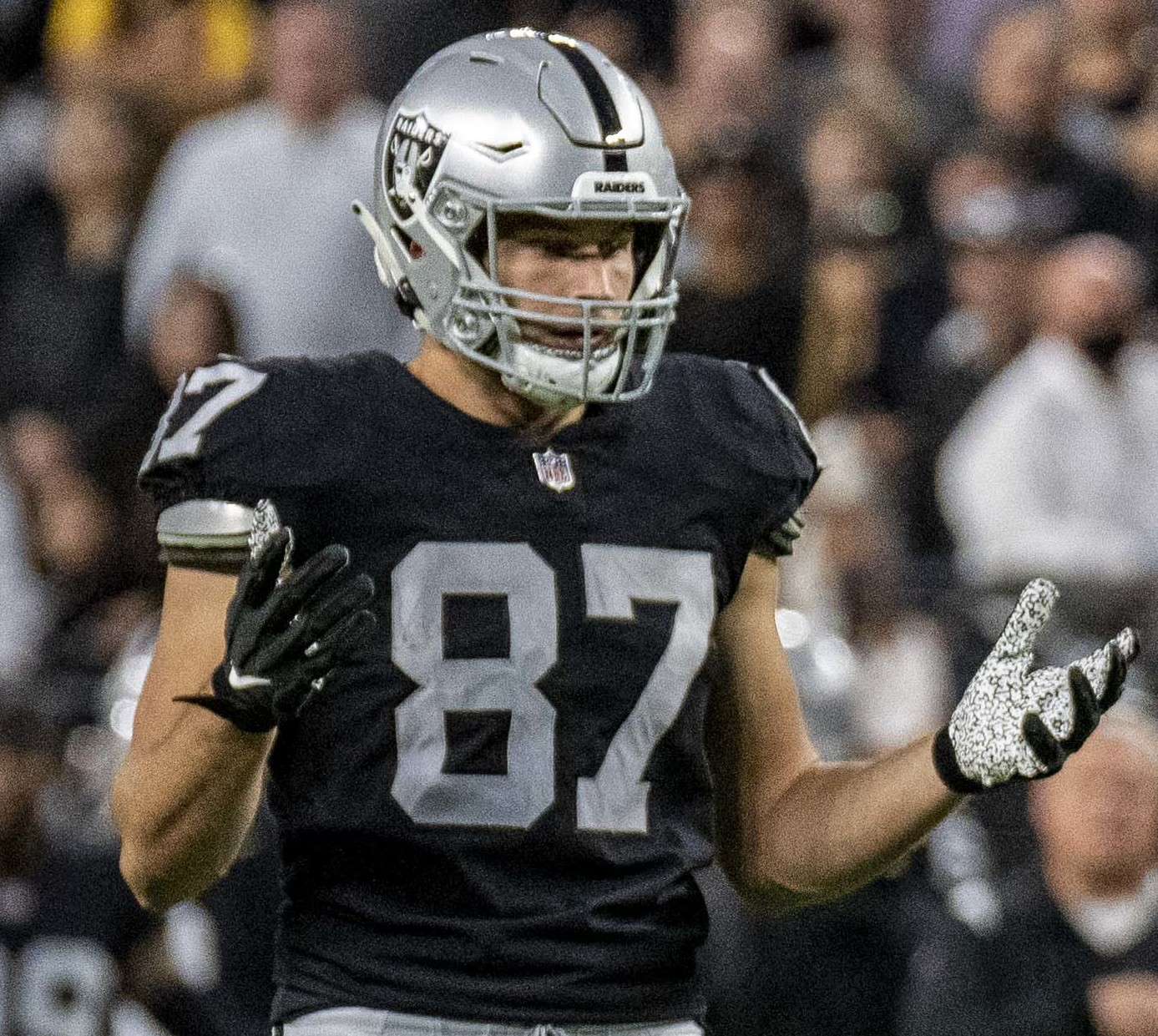
- Moreau with the Las Vegas Raiders in 2021

No. 87 – Houston Texans
- Position: Tight end
- Roster status: Active

Personal information
- Born: May 6, 1997 (age 29); New Orleans, Louisiana, U.S.
- Listed height: 6 ft 4 in (1.93 m)
- Listed weight: 250 lb (113 kg)

Career information
- High school: Jesuit (New Orleans)
- College: LSU (2015–2018)
- NFL draft: 2019: 4th round, 137th overall pick

Career history
- Oakland / Las Vegas Raiders (2019–2022); New Orleans Saints (2023–2025); Houston Texans (2026–present)

Career NFL statistics as of Week 5, 2026
- Receptions: 160
- Receiving yards: 1,837
- Receiving touchdowns: 19
- Stats at Pro Football Reference

Foster Moreau (born May 6, 1997) is an American professional football tight end for the Houston Texans in the National Football League (NFL). He played college football for the LSU Tigers, and played for the Las Vegas Raiders from 2019 to 2022.

== Early life ==
Moreau grew up in New Orleans and attended Jesuit High School, where he played high school football and basketball. As a High School senior, Moreau caught 34 passes for 454 yards and six touchdowns as the Blue Jays won the LHSAA Division I state championship. Rated a three-star prospect by 24/7 Sports and a two-star by Rivals.com, Moreau committed to play football at Louisiana State University over offers from Tulane, Mississippi State, Air Force, Louisiana Tech, Louisiana-Monroe, and Louisiana-Lafayette, among others.

== College career ==
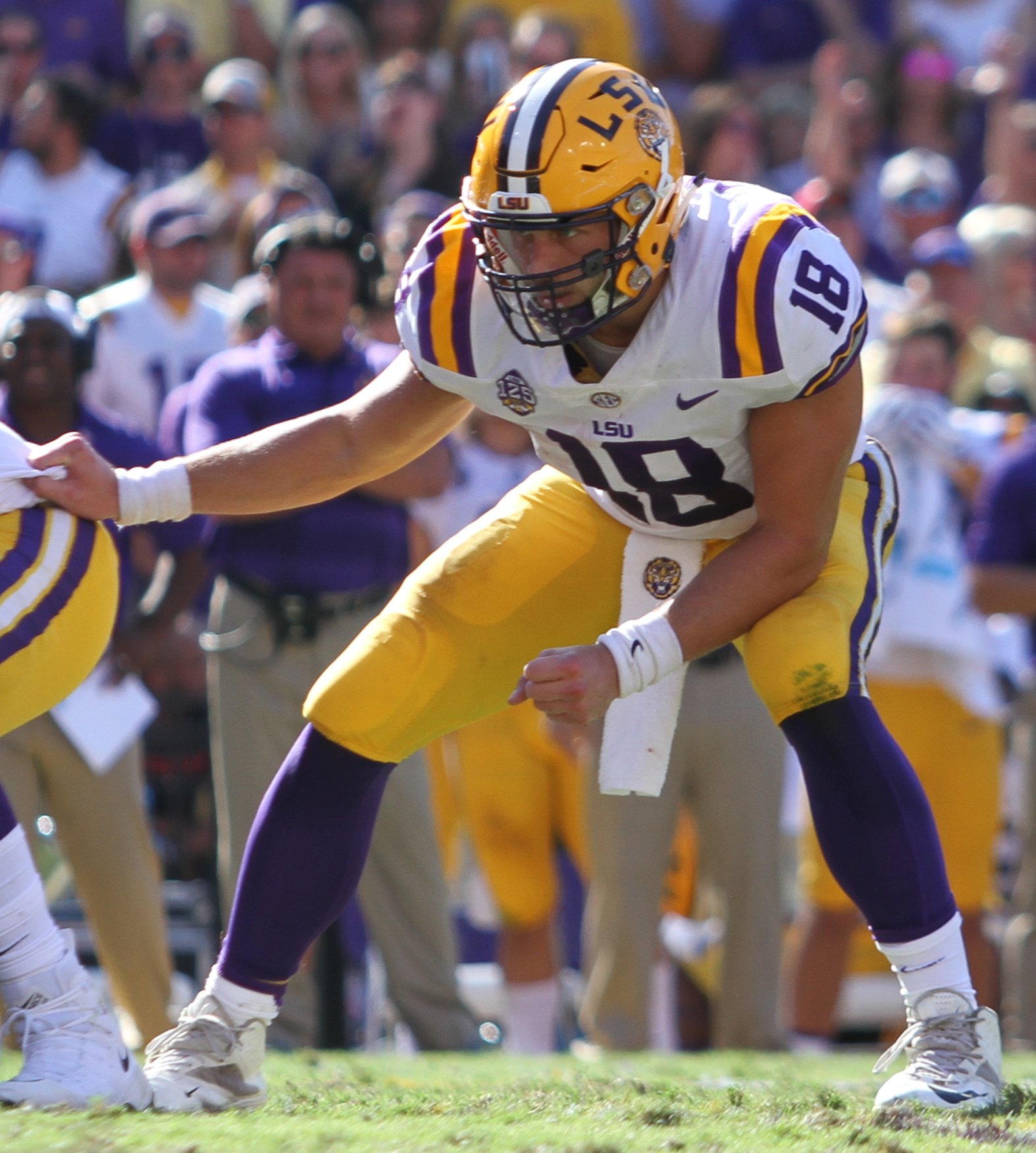
Moreau playing for LSU in 2018.

Moreau played four seasons for the LSU Tigers. He played mostly on special teams with the kick return unit and as a blocking tight end in his first two seasons, with no receptions as a freshman and six for 79 yards and one touchdown as a sophomore. Moreau enjoyed his most productive season in his first full year as a starter, catching 24 passes for 278 yards and three touchdowns.

Moreau entered his senior year on the Mackey Award watchlist, was named team captain and chosen to wear the No. 18 Jersey by the Tigers' coaching staff. In his final season, Moreau caught 22 passes for 272 yards and two touchdowns and continued to play on special teams as a blocker on the field goal unit. He finished his collegiate career with 52 receptions for 629 yards and six touchdowns in 49 career games (32 starts). Following the end of his senior season, Moreau was invited to play in the 2019 Senior Bowl, where he impressed NFL scouts in practice and caught one pass for 11 yards in the game.

== Professional career ==
Pre-draft measurables
| Height | Weight | Arm length | Hand span | Wingspan | 40-yard dash | 10-yard split | 20-yard split | 20-yard shuttle | Three-cone drill | Vertical jump | Broad jump | Bench press |
|---|---|---|---|---|---|---|---|---|---|---|---|---|
| 6 ft 4 1/8 in (1.93 m) | 253 lb (115 kg) | 33 1/2 in (0.85 m) | 9 5/8 in (0.24 m) | 6 ft 9 1/2 in (2.07 m) | 4.66 s | 1.55 s | 2.72 s | 4.11 s | 7.16 s | 36.5 in (0.93 m) | 10 ft 1 in (3.07 m) | 22 reps |
All values from NFL Combine

=== Las Vegas Raiders ===
Moreau was selected by the Oakland Raiders in the fourth round with the 137th overall pick in the 2019 NFL draft. On May 2, 2019, Moreau signed a four-year, $3 million contract that included a $488,484 signing bonus.

Moreau made his NFL debut on September 9, 2019, against the Denver Broncos on Monday Night Football, making two receptions for 20 yards. Moreau scored his first career touchdown, an 18-yard reception, on September 29, 2019, in a 31–24 win against the Indianapolis Colts. He was placed on injured reserve on December 9, 2019, after suffering a knee injury the day before in a game against the Tennessee Titans. Moreau finished his rookie season with 21 catches for 174 yards and five touchdowns in 13 games played (seven starts). Moreau was named to Pro Football Focus's All-Rookie team.

Moreau was fined US$15,000 by the NFL on October 5, 2020, for attending a maskless charity event hosted by teammate Darren Waller during the COVID-19 pandemic in violation of the NFL's COVID-19 protocols for the 2020 season. Moreau finished the season with 7 catches on 9 targets for 140 yards and two touchdowns.

=== New Orleans Saints ===
On May 10, 2023, Moreau signed a three-year, $12 million contract with the New Orleans Saints with $8 million guaranteed. In 15 appearances (10 starts) for New Orleans, he recorded 21 receptions for 193 yards and one touchdown.

On October 4, 2025, Moreau was activated from the PUP list for his season debut. He made 11 appearances (nine starts) for the Saints, logging seven receptions for 59 scoreless yards. On December 26, Moreau was placed on season-ending injured reserve due to an ankle injury suffered in Week 16 against the New York Jets.

=== Houston Texans ===
On March 16, 2026, Moreau signed a two-year, $7 million contract with the Houston Texans.

== Personal life ==
In March 2023, during a routine physical on a free agent visit with the New Orleans Saints, Moreau was diagnosed with Hodgkin’s lymphoma. Saints team physician Dr. John Amoss detected an enlarged lymph node on his left collarbone. On March 22, Moreau announced that he would be temporarily stepping away from football.

On May 10, after completing his treatment, Moreau signed a three-year, $12 million contract with the Saints. On July 3, he posted on social media that his cancer was now "in full remission."
