= Isaiah Johnson (cornerback, born 1995) =

American football cornerback (born 1995)

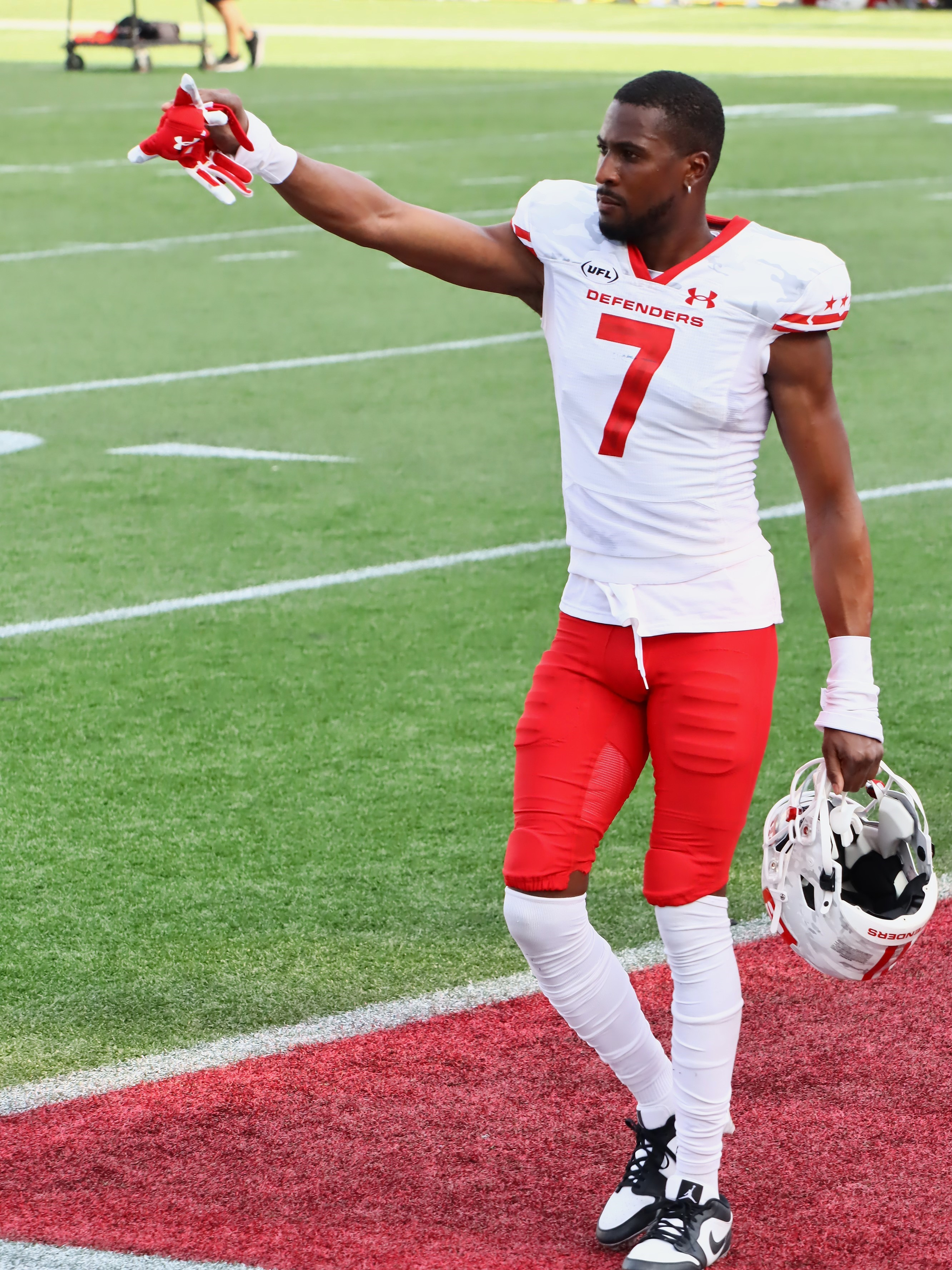
- Johnson with the DC Defenders in 2025

Profile
- Position: Cornerback

Personal information
- Born: December 20, 1995 (age 30); Bryan, Texas, U.S.
- Listed height: 6 ft 2 in (1.88 m)
- Listed weight: 208 lb (94 kg)

Career information
- High school: James Earl Rudder (Bryan)
- College: Houston (2014–2018)
- NFL draft: 2019: 4th round, 129th overall pick

Career history
- Oakland / Las Vegas Raiders (2019–2020); Dallas Cowboys (2021)*; Pittsburgh Steelers (2021)*; Arizona Cardinals (2021)*; Pittsburgh Steelers (2022)*; DC Defenders (2023–2026)
- * Offseason or practice squad member only

Awards and highlights
- UFL champion (2025)

Career NFL statistics
- Total tackles: 15
- Pass deflections: 5
- Stats at Pro Football Reference

Isaiah Johnson (born December 20, 1995) is an American professional football cornerback. He played college football at Houston.

== Early life ==
Johnson attended James Earl Rudder High School in Bryan, Texas. He committed to the University of Houston to play college football.

== College career ==
Johnson played at Houston from 2014 to 2018. He spent his first two years as a wide receiver before switching to cornerback prior to his junior year in 2017. During his two years as a receiver, he had 21 receptions for 208 yards. In his two years as a cornerback, he had 115 tackles and four interceptions.

== Professional career ==
Pre-draft measurables
Height	Weight	Arm length	Hand span	Wingspan	40-yard dash	10-yard split	20-yard split	20-yard shuttle	Three-cone drill	Vertical jump	Broad jump	Bench press
6 ft 2 1/8 in (1.88 m)	208 lb (94 kg)	33 in (0.84 m)	8 3/4 in (0.22 m)	6 ft 7 1/8 in (2.01 m)	4.40 s	1.50 s	2.56 s	4.06 s	6.81 s	36.5 in (0.93 m)	11 ft 1 in (3.38 m)	9 reps
All values from NFL Combine/Pro Day

=== Oakland / Las Vegas Raiders ===
Johnson was drafted by the Oakland Raiders in the fourth round (129th overall) of the 2019 NFL draft. He was placed on injured reserve on September 2, 2019. He was designated for return and began practicing again on October 14. He was activated on November 4.

On November 8, 2020, Johnson forced two incomplete passes on the last two plays of the game to seal the team's 31–26 win over the Los Angeles Chargers. In Week 10 against the Denver Broncos, Johnson was ejected from the game after punching Broncos' wide receiver Tim Patrick after Patrick punched Johnson's teammate Johnathan Abram. He was placed on the reserve/COVID-19 list by the team on November 18, and activated three days later. He was placed back on the COVID-19 list on December 19, 2020, and activated on December 23.

On August 31, 2021, Johnson was waived by the Raiders.

=== Dallas Cowboys ===
On October 5, 2021, Johnson was signed to the practice squad of the Dallas Cowboys. He was released on October 19.

=== Pittsburgh Steelers (first stint) ===
On December 14, 2021, Johnson was signed to the Pittsburgh Steelers practice squad. He was released on December 20.

=== Arizona Cardinals ===
On December 29, 2021, Johnson was signed to the Arizona Cardinals practice squad. He was released on January 4, 2022.

=== Pittsburgh Steelers (second stint) ===
On January 19, 2022, Johnson signed a reserve/future contract with the Steelers. He was waived/injured on May 10, 2022, and placed on injured reserve. He was released with an injury settlement on June 10, 2022.

=== DC Defenders ===
On April 5, 2023, Johnson signed with the DC Defenders of the XFL. He was placed on the team's reserve list on April 25, and activated on May 16. He was released on March 20, 2025, but was re-signed on April 29. He was re-signed on June 9, 2026. He was retained after the season.
