= New Oxford High School =

Coordinates: 39.86725°N 77.05255°W

New Oxford Senior High School
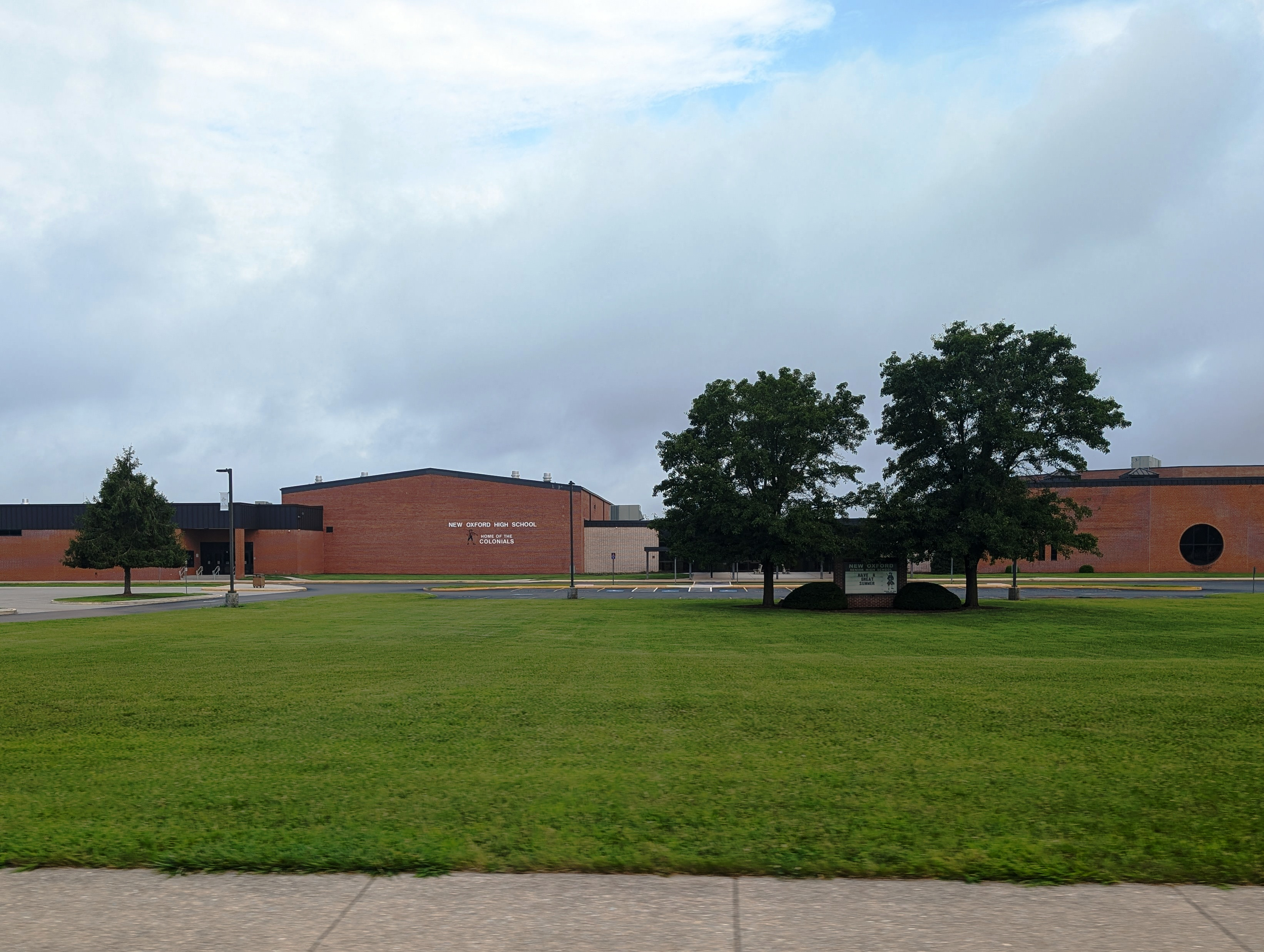
- 130 Berlin Road; New Oxford, Adams County, Pennsylvania 17350-1206; United States

Information
- Type: Public
- Motto: Pioneers in Educational Excellence
- Founded: 1949
- Principal: Nancy Herb
- Teaching staff: 85.15 (FTE)
- Grades: 9-12
- Enrollment: 1,252 (2023-2024)
- Student to teacher ratio: 14.70
- Campus type: Rural
- Colors: Maroon and gray (Sports teams use red and blue)
- Mascot: Colonials
- Website: www.conewago.k12.pa.us

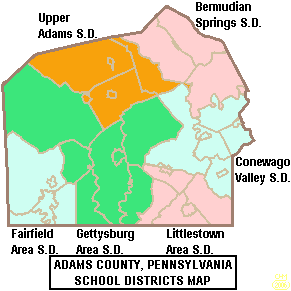
Map of Adams County, Pennsylvania School Districts

New Oxford High School is a midsized public high school located in the borough of New Oxford, Pennsylvania. The school is the sole high school in the Conewago Valley School District. New Oxford High School serves students from a portion of eastern Adams County. In 2016, enrollment at New Oxford High School was reported as 1,208 pupils in 9th through 12th grades, with 34% of pupils eligible for a free lunch due to the family meeting the federal poverty level. Additionally, 13% of pupils received special education services, while 4% of pupils were identified as gifted. The school employed 75 teachers. In 2014, enrollment was reported as 1,244 pupils in 9th through 12th grades, with 32.8% of pupils eligible for a free lunch due to family poverty. Additionally, 14% of pupils received special education services, while 3% of pupils were identified as gifted. The school employed 76 teachers. Per the Pennsylvania Department of Education, 4% of the teachers were rated "Non-Highly Qualified" under the federal No Child Left Behind Act.

According to the National Center for Education Statistics, in 2010, New Oxford High School reported an enrollment of 1,281 pupils in grades 9th through 12th.

== Extracurriculars ==
New Oxford High School offers a wide variety of clubs, activities and an extensive sports program.

=== Sports ===
The district funds:

Boys

- Baseball - AAAAA
- Basketball- AAAAA
- Cross Country - AAA
- Football - AAAAA
- Golf - AAA
- Indoor Track and Field - AAAA
- Lacrosse - AA
- Soccer - AAAA
- Swimming and Diving - AAA
- Tennis - AAA
- Track and Field - AAA
- Volleyball - AAA
- Wrestling - AAA

Girls

- Basketball - AAAAA
- Cheer - AAAAAA
- Cross Country - AAA
- Field Hockey - AA
- Golf - AAA
- Indoor Track and Field - AAAA
- Lacrosse - AAA
- Soccer (Fall) - AAAA
- Softball - AAAAA
- Swimming and Diving - AAA
- Girls' Tennis - AAA
- Track and Field - AAA
- Volleyball - AAAA

The high school's sports program is fed by an extensive middle school program.

Middle School Sports

Boys

- Basketball
- Cross Country
- Football
- Soccer
- Track and Field
- Wrestling

Girls

- Basketball
- Cheer
- Cross Country
- Field Hockey
- Soccer
- Track and Field
- Volleyball

According to PIAA directory July 2016

== See also ==
High schools in Pennsylvania
