= Jeremiah Valoaga =

American football player (born 1994)

No. 78, 92, 98
- Position: Defensive end

Personal information
- Born: November 15, 1994 (age 32); Oxnard, California, U.S.
- Listed height: 6 ft 6 in (1.98 m)
- Listed weight: 275 lb (125 kg)

Career information
- High school: Channel Islands (Oxnard)
- College: UNLV (2012–2016)
- NFL draft: 2017: undrafted

Career history
- Detroit Lions (2017); Miami Dolphins (2018–2019)*; San Francisco 49ers (2019); Oakland / Las Vegas Raiders (2019–2020); New York Jets (2021)*; Tampa Bay Bandits (2022); Memphis Showboats (2023)
- * Offseason or practice squad member only

Career NFL statistics
- Total tackles: 7
- Sacks: 1.0
- Stats at Pro Football Reference

Jeremiah Isaiah Valoaga (born November 15, 1994) is an American former professional football player who was a defensive end in the National Football League (NFL). He played college football for the UNLV Rebels, and was signed by the Detroit Lions as an undrafted free agent in 2017.

== Early life ==
Valoaga was born in Oxnard, California. He graduated from Channel Islands High School in 2012. He is of Samoan descent.

== College statistics ==
			Defense				
Year	Team	GP	Tackles	For Loss	Sacks	Int	FF
2012	UNLV	12	21	4.0	1.5	0	0
2013	UNLV	9	27	5.5	1.0	0	0
2014	UNLV	Redshirt season					
2015	UNLV	4	15	4.0	2.0	0	10
2016	UNLV	10	24	5.5	4.0	0	0
College totals		35	87	19.0	8.5	0	0

== Professional career ==
=== Detroit Lions ===
Valoaga signed with the Detroit Lions as an undrafted free agent on May 12, 2017. On September 24, 2017, he recorded the first sack of his NFL career during a 26–30 loss against the Atlanta Falcons. On November 25, 2017, Valoaga was waived by the Lions and was re-signed to the practice squad. He signed a reserve/future contract with the Lions on January 1, 2018.

On August 31, 2018, Valoaga was waived by the Lions.

=== Miami Dolphins ===
On September 26, 2018, Valoaga was signed to the Miami Dolphins' practice squad. He signed a reserve/future contract with the Dolphins on January 1, 2019. On May 1, 2019, the Dolphins waived Valoaga.

=== San Francisco 49ers ===
On August 8, 2019, Valoaga was signed by the San Francisco 49ers. In the preseason, Valoaga led the 49ers in sacks. He was waived on August 31, 2019 and was signed to the practice squad the next day. He was promoted to the active roster on November 25, 2019. He was waived on December 23, 2019.

=== Oakland / Las Vegas Raiders ===
On December 24, 2019, Valoaga was claimed off waivers by the Oakland Raiders.

Valoaga re-signed on a one-year exclusive-rights free agent contract with the Las Vegas Raiders on April 17, 2020. He chose to opt-out of the 2020 season due to the COVID-19 pandemic on August 3, 2020. He was waived after the season on March 1, 2021.

=== New York Jets ===
On July 27, 2021, Valoaga signed with the New York Jets. He was waived on August 31, 2021.

=== Tampa Bay Bandits ===
Valoaga signed with the Tampa Bay Bandits of the United States Football League on June 11, 2022, and was subsequently transferred to the team's inactive roster.

=== Memphis Showboats ===
Valoaga and all other Tampa Bay Bandits players were all transferred to the Memphis Showboats after it was announced that the Bandits were taking a hiatus and that the Showboats were joining the league. Valoaga was placed on the team's injured reserve list on May 25, 2023. He was re-signed by the team on August 18, 2023. He was released on March 10, 2024.
