= Darren Waller =

American football player (born 1992)

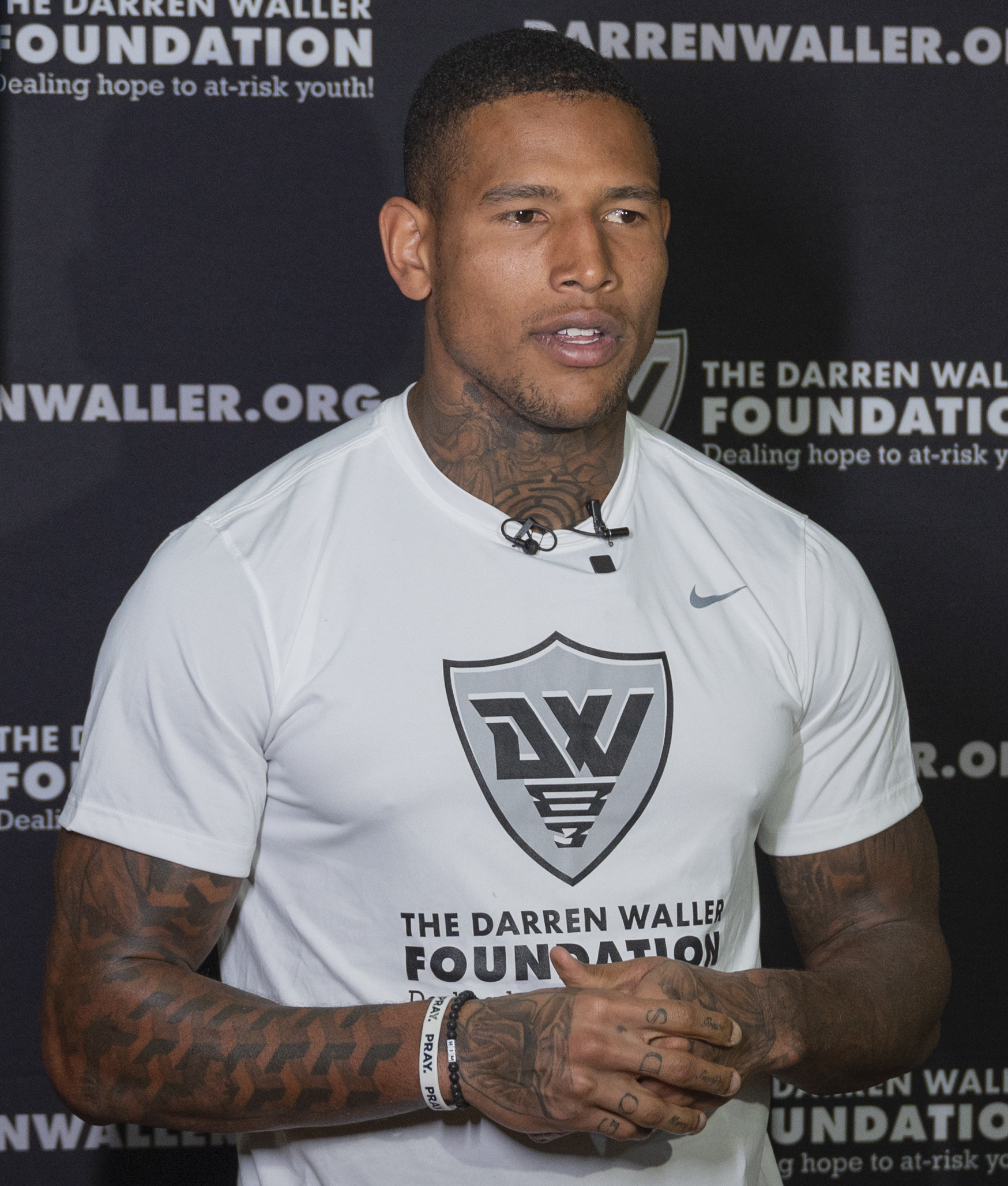
- Waller at Nevada’s Nellis Air Force Base in 2022

No. 88 – Carolina Panthers
- Position: Tight end
- Roster status: Active

Personal information
- Born: September 13, 1992 (age 34); Landover, Maryland, U.S.
- Listed height: 6 ft 6 in (1.98 m)
- Listed weight: 238 lb (108 kg)

Career information
- High school: North Cobb (Kennesaw, Georgia)
- College: Georgia Tech (2011–2014)
- NFL draft: 2015: 6th round, 204th overall pick

Career history
- Baltimore Ravens (2015–2018); Oakland / Las Vegas Raiders (2018–2022); New York Giants (2023); Miami Dolphins (2025); Carolina Panthers (2026–present)

Awards and highlights
- Pro Bowl (2020)

Career NFL statistics as of Week 10, 2026
- Receptions: 399
- Receiving yards: 4,730
- Receiving touchdowns: 30
- Stats at Pro Football Reference

Darren Charles Waller (born September 13, 1992) is an American professional football tight end for the Carolina Panthers of the National Football League (NFL). He played college football for the Georgia Tech Yellow Jackets and was selected by the Baltimore Ravens in the sixth round of the 2015 NFL draft.

== Early life ==
Darren Waller was born in Landover, Maryland, to Dorian and Charlena Waller. He has a sister, Deanna. His great-grandfather was jazz pianist Fats Waller. He was raised in Colorado Springs, Colorado, and Acworth, Georgia. He produces hip-hop music in his spare time.

== College career ==
Waller attended and played college football at Georgia Tech as a wide receiver where he redshirted his freshman season of 2011 and forwent his final year of eligibility by entering the 2015 NFL draft.

== Professional career ==
Pre-draft measurables
Height	Weight	Arm length	Hand span	Wingspan	40-yard dash	10-yard split	20-yard split	20-yard shuttle	Three-cone drill	Vertical jump	Broad jump	Bench press
6 ft 6 1/8 in (1.98 m)	238 lb (108 kg)	33 1/4 in (0.84 m)	9 in (0.23 m)	6 ft 8 1/2 in (2.04 m)	4.46 s	1.57 s	2.62 s	4.25 s	7.07 s	37.0 in (0.94 m)	10 ft 5 in (3.18 m)	12 reps
All values from NFL Combine

=== Baltimore Ravens ===
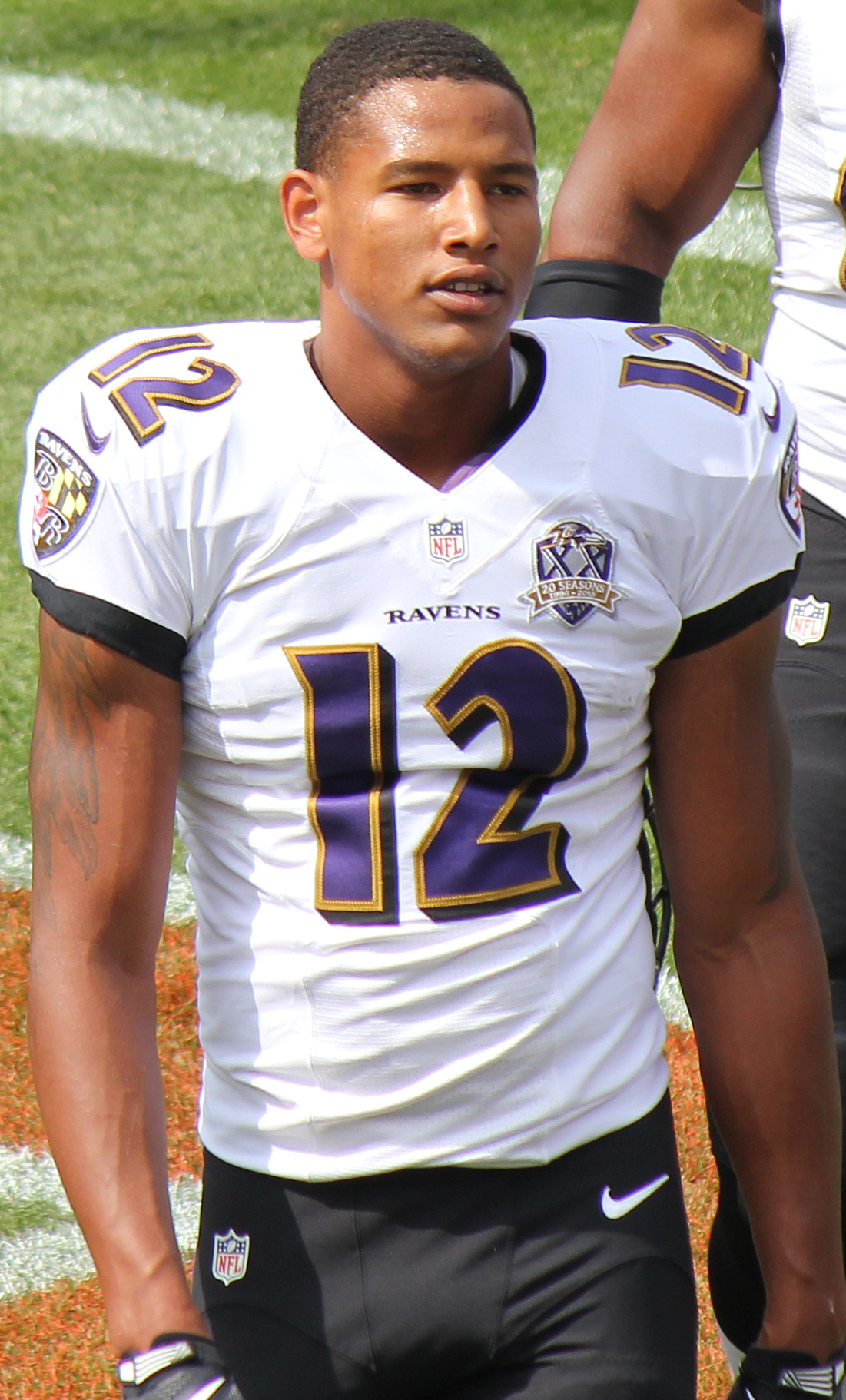
Waller with the Baltimore Ravens in 2015

==== 2015 ====
The Baltimore Ravens selected Waller in the sixth round with the 204th overall pick in the 2015 NFL draft. The selection was acquired in a trade with the Dallas Cowboys in exchange for Baltimore's seventh-round pick (No. 243: Laurence Gibson) and Rolando McClain. Waller became the 27th wide receiver drafted in 2015. On May 7, 2015, the Ravens signed Waller to a four-year, $2.39 million contract that included a signing bonus of $104,732.

Throughout training camp, Waller competed for a roster spot as a backup wide receiver against Marlon Brown, Michael Campanaro, and Kamar Aiken. Head coach John Harbaugh named Waller the sixth wide receiver on the depth chart to begin his rookie season, behind Steve Smith Sr., Aiken, Campanaro, Brown, and Breshad Perriman.

On October 29, 2015, Waller was placed on the injured reserve list, ending his season.

==== 2016 ====
In March, Waller converted to the tight end position.

On July 1, 2016, Waller was suspended for the first four games of the 2016 NFL season for violating the league's substance-abuse policy.

==== 2017 ====
On June 30, 2017, Waller was suspended for one year without pay for again violating the substance-abuse policy.

==== 2018 ====
On August 7, 2018, Waller was reinstated by the league after completing a rehabilitation program at Borden Cottage and serving his year-long suspension. He was waived on September 1, 2018, and was signed to the practice squad the next day.

=== Oakland / Las Vegas Raiders ===
==== 2018 ====
On November 26, 2018, Waller was signed by the Oakland Raiders off the Ravens' practice squad. During the 2018 season, he appeared in four games and had six receptions for 75 yards.

==== 2019 ====
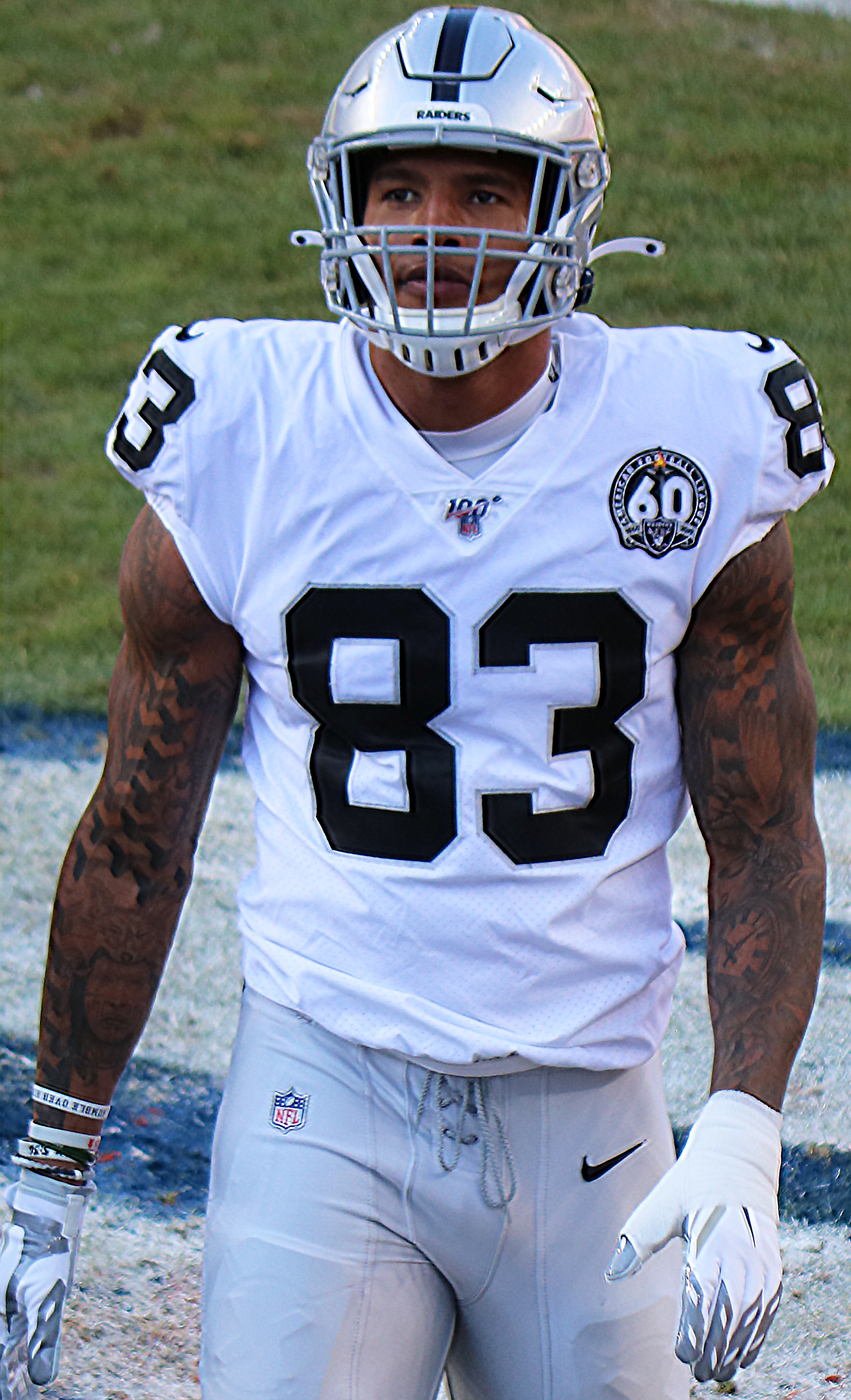
Waller with the Oakland Raiders in 2019

On Hard Knocks with the Raiders, he was featured in an episode detailing his struggle with substance abuse and his steps taken to overcome it. In Week 1 of the 2019 season against the Denver Broncos, Waller caught seven passes for 70 yards in the 24–16 win. During Week 3 against the Minnesota Vikings, Waller finished with 134 receiving yards on 13 receptions, marking his first career game with over 100 yards, but the Raiders lost 34–14. On October 16, 2019, Waller signed a three-year contract extension with the Raiders through the 2023 season. In Week 7 against the Green Bay Packers, Waller caught seven passes for 126 yards and two touchdowns in the 42–24 loss. In Week 13 against the Kansas City Chiefs, Waller caught seven passes for 100 yards in the 40–9 loss. In Week 14 against the Tennessee Titans, he caught seven passes for 63 yards in a 42–21 loss. During Week 15 against the Jacksonville Jaguars, Waller finished with eight catches for 122 receiving yards as the Raiders lost 20–16. In Week 17 against the Denver Broncos, Waller caught six passes for 107 yards, including a 75-yard catch, during the 16–15 loss. Waller was named as an alternate to the 2020 Pro Bowl, and after the Kansas City Chiefs advanced to the Super Bowl, he was originally supposed to be named in as a replacement for Travis Kelce, but he had recently had thumb surgery and was unable to play. Jack Doyle was instead named as Kelce's alternate. Waller finished the 2019 season with 90 receptions for 1,145 yards and three touchdowns. He was ranked 99th by his fellow players on the NFL Top 100 Players of 2020.

==== 2020 ====
In Week 2 of the 2020 season against the New Orleans Saints, he had 12 receptions for 103 receiving yards and one receiving touchdown in the 34–24 victory. He was fined $30,000 by the NFL on October 5, 2020, for hosting a maskless charity event during the COVID-19 pandemic in violation of the NFL's COVID-19 protocols for the 2020 season. In Week 13 against the New York Jets, Waller had 13 receptions for 200 receiving yards, establishing a new Raiders franchise record for a tight end, while also scoring two touchdowns in a 31–28 win. In Week 15 against the Los Angeles Chargers, Waller had nine receptions for 150 yards and a touchdown during the 30–27 overtime loss. In Week 16 against the Miami Dolphins, Waller recorded 5 catches for 112 yards during the 26–25 loss. In Week 17 against the Denver Broncos, Waller recorded nine catches for 117 yards and a touchdown as well as catching the game winning two-point conversion attempt late in the fourth quarter to secure a 32–31 win for the Raiders. For the 2020 season, Waller established career highs in receptions (107), receiving yards (1,196) and touchdowns (9). His 107 receptions ranked fourth in the NFL and first among tight ends, while his yardage ranked tenth overall and second among tight ends (behind Travis Kelce's 1,416 yards). He was named to the Pro Bowl for the first time. He was ranked 35th by his fellow players on the NFL Top 100 Players of 2021.

==== 2021 ====
In the 2021 regular season opener, Waller had 10 receptions for 105 receiving yards and a touchdown in the 33–27 overtime victory over the Ravens. In Week 11, against the Cincinnati Bengals, he had seven receptions for 116 yards. He finished the 2021 season with 55 receptions for 665 receiving yards and two receiving touchdowns in 11 games. He was ranked 58th by his fellow players on the NFL Top 100 Players of 2022.

==== 2022 ====
On September 10, 2022, Waller signed a three-year, $51 million contract extension with the Raiders, becoming the highest-paid tight end in the league. He was placed on injured reserve on November 10, 2022. He was activated on December 17.

=== New York Giants ===
On March 15, 2023, Waller was traded to the New York Giants for a compensatory 2023 third-round pick that had been traded from the Kansas City Chiefs for Kadarius Toney. He suffered a hamstring injury in Week 8 and was placed on injured reserve on November 4, 2023. He was reactivated on December 17.

On June 9, 2024, Waller announced his retirement from football and did not play for the 2024 season.

=== Miami Dolphins ===
On July 1, 2025, the New York Giants traded Waller along with a conditional 2027 seventh-round pick (of which the conditions were met but unclear to what they were) to the Miami Dolphins in exchange for a 2026 sixth-round pick (No. 192: J.C. Davis) following his decision to come out of retirement. Waller's first game post-retirement came in Week 4 against the New York Jets; he had two touchdowns during the game. On October 22, Waller was placed on injured reserve due to a pectoral injury suffered in Week 7 against the Cleveland Browns. He was activated on November 29, ahead of the team's Week 13 matchup against the New Orleans Saints. On January 2, Waller was again placed on injured reserve due to a groin injury. He finished the season with 24 catches for 283 yards and six touchdowns.

=== Carolina Panthers ===
On August 12, 2026, Waller signed a one-year contract with the Carolina Panthers.

== Career statistics ==
=== NFL ===
Legend
	Led the league (for tight ends)
**Bold**	Career highs

>

Year	Team	Games		Receiving					Rushing					Fumbles	
Year	Team	GP	GS	Rec	Yds	Avg	Lng	TD	Att	Yds	Avg	Lng	TD	Fum	Lost
2015	BAL	6	1	2	18	9.0	17	0	0	0	0.0	0	0	0	0
2016	BAL	12	3	10	85	8.5	15	2	0	0	0.0	0	0	0	0
2017	BAL	0	0	Suspended											
2018	OAK	4	0	6	75	12.5	44	0	1	**21**	**21.0**	**21**	0	0	0
2019	OAK	**16**	**16**	90	1,145	**12.7**	**75**	3	**2**	5	2.5	7	0	1	1
2020	LV	**16**	15	**107**	**1,196**	11.2	38	**9**	0	0	0.0	0	0	**2**	**2**
2021	LV	11	11	55	665	12.1	33	2	0	0	0.0	0	0	0	0
2022	LV	9	6	28	388	13.9	31	3	0	0	0.0	0	0	0	0
2023	NYG	12	11	52	552	10.6	29	1	0	0	0.0	0	0	0	0
2025	MIA	9	3	24	283	11.8	34	6	1	4	4.0	4	0	0	0
2026	CAR	9	5	25	323	12.9	50	4	0	0	0.0	0	0	0	0
Career		104	71	399	4,730	11.9	75	30	4	30	7.5	21	0	3	3

=== College ===
Season	Team	Conf	Class	Pos	GP	Receiving			
Season	Team	Conf	Class	Pos	GP	Rec	Yds	Avg	TD
2012	Georgia Tech	ACC	SO	WR	14	8	162	20.3	0
2013	Georgia Tech	ACC	JR	WR	9	17	367	21.6	3
2014	Georgia Tech	ACC	SR	WR	10	26	442	17.0	6
Career					33	51	971	19.0	9

== Personal life ==
Waller began abusing oxycodone at 15 years old and drinking alcohol at 16 years old. His oxycodone addiction escalated to the point that he was eventually spending $100 per day on pills. Later in life, he began using "a lot of" cocaine. On August 11, 2017, in Maryland, he overdosed on pills while sitting in his parked Jeep. After spending 34 days in a substance abuse rehabilitation program in Camden, Maine, he took a job stocking shelves at a Sprouts Farmers Market.

Waller founded the Darren Waller Foundation in 2020 to "equip youth to avoid and overcome addiction to drugs and alcohol and support youth and their families during their recovery and treatment journey."

On March 4, 2023, Waller married Las Vegas Aces point guard Kelsey Plum. Waller and Plum divorced in 2024.

In 2024, Waller released an original song, "Who Knew".
