= 2015 Oakland Raiders season =

56th season in franchise history

- Owner: Mark Davis
- General manager: Reggie McKenzie
- Head coach: Jack Del Rio
- Home stadium: O.co Coliseum

Results
- Record: 7–9
- Division place: 3rd AFC West
- Playoffs: Did not qualify
- All-Pros: Khalil Mack (1st team); Charles Woodson (2nd team)
- Pro Bowlers: Derek Carr, QB; Amari Cooper, WR; Khalil Mack, DE; Latavius Murray, RB; Marcel Reece, FB; Charles Woodson, SS

Uniform
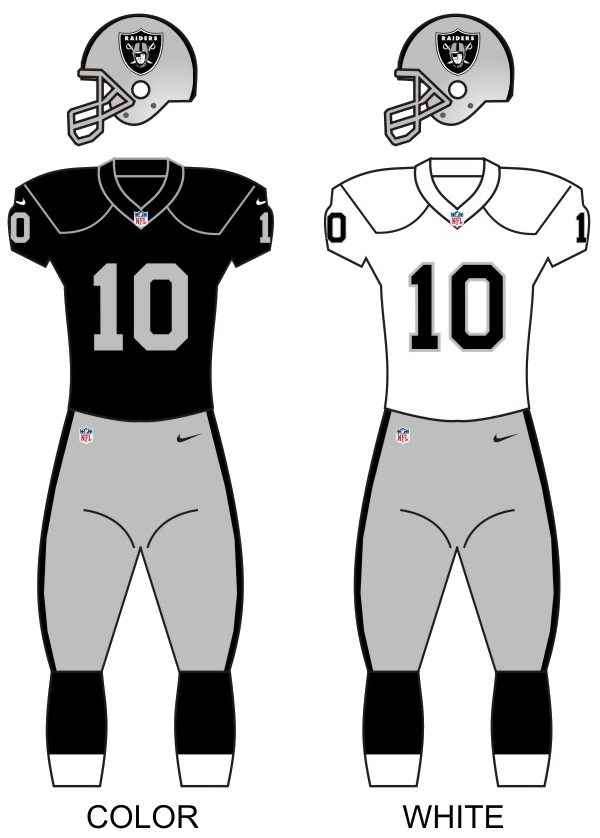

The 2015 season was the Oakland Raiders' 46th in the National Football League (NFL), their 56th overall, the 21st of their second stint in Oakland and their first under new head coach Jack Del Rio. Coming off a 3–13 season the previous year, the Raiders improved to 7–9 on the season. Despite their improvement, the Raiders were eliminated from playoff contention in Week 15 with a loss to the Green Bay Packers at home. They once again failed to finish with a winning record, not having done so since 2002. This meant that the Raiders were the only team from 2003 to 2015 that did not have a single winning season.

== Notable players acquired ==
Pos.	Player	Age	2014 Team
RB	Roy Helu	26	Washington Redskins
WR	Michael Crabtree	27	San Francisco 49ers
TE	Lee Smith	27	Buffalo Bills
C	Rodney Hudson	26	Kansas City Chiefs
DT	Dan Williams	28	Arizona Cardinals
LB	Curtis Lofton	29	New Orleans Saints
LB	Malcolm Smith	26	Seattle Seahawks
S	Nate Allen	27	Philadelphia Eagles

== 2015 draft class ==
2015 Oakland Raiders Draft
Round	Selection	Player	Position	College
1	4	Amari Cooper	WR	Alabama
2	35	Mario Edwards Jr.	DE	Florida State
3	68	Clive Walford	TE	Miami (FL)
4	128	Jonathan Feliciano	OG	Miami (FL)
5	140	Ben Heeney	ILB	Kansas
5	161	Neiron Ball	OLB	Florida
6	179	Max Valles	DE	Virginia
7	218	Anthony Morris	OT	Tennessee State
7	221	Andre Debose	WR	Florida
7	242	Dexter McDonald	CB	Kansas

== Staff ==
2015 Oakland Raiders staff
Front office: Owner – Mark Davis; President – Marc Badain; Executive vice president/general counsel – Dan Ventrelle; General manager – Reggie McKenzie; Director of football administration – Tom Delaney; Director of player personnel – Joey Clinkscales; Director of pro personnel – Dane Van Der Nat; Director of college scouting – Shaun Herock; Head coaches: Head coach – Jack Del Rio; Offensive coaches: Offensive coordinator – Bill Musgrave; Quarterbacks – Todd Downing; Running backs – Bernie Parmalee; Wide receivers – Rob Moore; Tight ends – Bobby Johnson; Offensive line – Mike Tice; Assistant offensive line – Tim Holt; Senior offensive assistant – Jake Peetz; Offensive quality control – Nick Holz	Defensive coaches: Defensive coordinator – Ken Norton Jr.; Defensive line – Jethro Franklin; Linebackers – Sal Sunseri; Assistant linebackers – Brent Vieselmeyer; Defensive backs – Marcus Robertson; Assistant defensive backs – Rod Woodson; Defensive assistant – Sam Anno; Defensive quality control – Travis Smith; Special teams coaches: Special teams coordinator – Brad Seely; Assistant special teams – Tracy Smith; Strength and conditioning: Head strength and conditioning – Joe Gomes; Assistant strength and conditioning – Darryl Eto; Assistant strength and conditioning – Kevin Kijowski; Assistant strength and conditioning – Wesley Miller

== Roster ==
2015 Oakland Raiders roster
Quarterbacks (QB): 4 Derek Carr; 14 Matt McGloin; Running backs (RB): 26 Roy Helu; 22 Taiwan Jones; 28 Latavius Murray; 49 Jamize Olawale FB; Wide receivers (WR): 89 Amari Cooper; 15 Michael Crabtree; 18 Andre Holmes; 10 Seth Roberts; 13 Jeremy Ross; 80 Rod Streater; Tight ends (TE): 82 Gabe Holmes; 81 Mychal Rivera; 86 Lee Smith; 88 Clive Walford	Offensive linemen (OL): 69 Khalif Barnes T; 70 Tony Bergstrom C; 68 Jon Feliciano G; 61 Rodney Hudson C; 66 Gabe Jackson G; 73 Matt McCants T; 72 Donald Penn T; 76 J'Marcus Webb G/T; Defensive linemen (DL): 96 Denico Autry DE; 78 Justin Ellis DT; 75 Shelby Harris DE; 52 Khalil Mack DE; 95 Benson Mayowa DE; 92 Stacy McGee DT; 93 Leon Orr DT; 90 Dan Williams DT	Linebackers (LB): 56 Lorenzo Alexander OLB; 51 Ben Heeney OLB; 50 Curtis Lofton MLB; 55 John Lotulelei OLB; 53 Malcolm Smith OLB; 54 Korey Toomer MLB; Defensive backs (DB): 29 David Amerson CB; 42 Larry Asante FS; 38 T. J. Carrie CB/FS; 30 SaQwan Edwards CB; 25 D. J. Hayden CB; 27 Taylor Mays SS; 35 Dewey McDonald SS; 21 Dexter McDonald CB; 37 Tevin McDonald FS; 39 Keith McGill SS; 31 Neiko Thorpe CB; 24 Charles Woodson SS; Special teams (ST): 47 Thomas Gafford LS; 11 Sebastian Janikowski K; 7 Marquette King P	Practice squad: 34 George Atkinson III RB; 74 Mitch Bell G; 5 Garrett Gilbert QB; 35 Chris Hackett FS; 32 Keenan Lambert SS (IR); 64 Cole Manhart G; 17 Larry Pinkard WR; 46 Josh Shirley OLB; 48 Colton Underwood OLB; Reserve: 20 Nate Allen FS (IR); 58 Neiron Ball OLB (IR); 59 Jon Condo LS (IR); 84 Andre Debose WR (IR); 97 Mario Edwards Jr. DE (IR); 43 Jimmy Hall FS (IR); 77 Austin Howard T (IR); 45 Marcel Reece FB (Susp.); 99 Aldon Smith OLB (Susp.); 91 Justin Tuck DE (IR); 71 Menelik Watson T (IR); Rookies in italics 53 active, 12 reserve, 8 practice squad

== Schedule ==
=== Preseason ===
Week	Date	Opponent	Result	Record	Game site	NFL.com recap
1	August 14	St. Louis Rams	**W** 18–3	1–0	O.co Coliseum	Recap
2	August 22	at Minnesota Vikings	**L** 12–20	1–1	TCF Bank Stadium	Recap
3	August 30	Arizona Cardinals	**L** 23–30	1–2	O.co Coliseum	Recap
4	September 3	at Seattle Seahawks	**L** 21–31	1–3	CenturyLink Field	Recap

=== Regular season ===
Week	Date	Opponent	Result	Record	Game site	NFL.com recap
1	September 13	Cincinnati Bengals	**L** 13–33	0–1	O.co Coliseum	Recap
2	September 20	Baltimore Ravens	**W** 37–33	1–1	O.co Coliseum	Recap
3	September 27	at Cleveland Browns	**W** 27–20	2–1	FirstEnergy Stadium	Recap
4	October 4	at Chicago Bears	**L** 20–22	2–2	Soldier Field	Recap
5	October 11	**Denver Broncos**	**L** 10–16	2–3	O.co Coliseum	Recap
6	Bye					
7	October 25	at **San Diego Chargers**	**W** 37–29	3–3	Qualcomm Stadium	Recap
8	November 1	New York Jets	**W** 34–20	4–3	O.co Coliseum	Recap
9	November 8	at Pittsburgh Steelers	**L** 35–38	4–4	Heinz Field	Recap
10	November 15	Minnesota Vikings	**L** 14–30	4–5	O.co Coliseum	Recap
11	November 22	at Detroit Lions	**L** 13–18	4–6	Ford Field	Recap
12	November 29	at Tennessee Titans	**W** 24–21	5–6	Nissan Stadium	Recap
13	December 6	**Kansas City Chiefs**	**L** 20–34	5–7	O.co Coliseum	Recap
14	December 13	at **Denver Broncos**	**W** 15–12	6–7	Sports Authority Field at Mile High	Recap
15	December 20	Green Bay Packers	**L** 20–30	6–8	O.co Coliseum	Recap
16	December 24	**San Diego Chargers**	**W** 23–20 (OT)	7–8	O.co Coliseum	Recap
17	January 3	at **Kansas City Chiefs**	**L** 17–23	7–9	Arrowhead Stadium	Recap

Note: Intra-division opponents are in bold text.

=== Game summaries ===
==== Week 1: vs. Cincinnati Bengals ====
Week One: Cincinnati Bengals at Oakland Raiders – Game summary

Quarter	1	2	3	4	Total
**Bengals**	7	17	9	0	**33**
Raiders	0	0	0	13	**13**

at O.co Coliseum, Oakland, California

- Date: September 13
- Game time: 1:25 p.m. PDT
- Game weather: 73 °F (23 °C), cloudy
- Game attendance: 54,500
- Referee: Brad Allen
- TV announcers (CBS): Tom McCarthy and Chris Simms
- Recap, Gamebook

Game information

**First quarter**

- CIN – Jeremy Hill 3 yard run, Mike Nugent kick. CIN 7 – OAK 0
- CIN – Nugent 32 yard FG. CIN 10 – OAK 0

**Second quarter**

- CIN – Hill 2 yard run, Nugent kick. CIN 17 – OAK 0
- CIN – Tyler Eifert 13 yard reception from Andy Dalton, Nugent kick. CIN 24 – OAK 0

**Third quarter**

- CIN – Eifert 8 yard reception from Andy Dalton, Nugent kick failed. CIN 30 – OAK 0
- CIN – Nugent 35 yard FG. CIN 33 – OAK 0

**Fourth quarter**

- OAK – Marcel Reece 11 yard reception from Matt McGloin, Sebastian Janikowski kick. CIN 33 – OAK 7
- OAK – Reece 9 yard reception from McGloin, 2 point conversion failed. CIN 33 – OAK 13

**Top passers**

- CIN – Andy Dalton – 25–34, 269 YDS, 2 TD
- OAK – Matt McGloin – 23–31, 142 YDS, 2 TD, 1 INT

**Top rushers**

- CIN – Jeremy Hill – 19 ATT, 63 YDS
- OAK – Latavius Murray – 11 ATT, 44 YDS

**Top receivers**

- CIN – Tyler Eifert – 9 REC, 104 YDS, 2 TD
- OAK – Amari Cooper – 7 REC, 47 YDS

**Top tacklers**

- CIN – Adam Jones – 10
- OAK – Larry Asante – 7

The Bengals jumped on the Raiders early and often, leading 24–0 at the half. Derek Carr left the game in the first half with an injury to his throwing hand, which resulted in Matt McGloin taking over. The Raiders mustered two touchdowns in the fourth quarter, but it was too little too late, losing the game 33–13 to start their season 0–1. The loss marked the first ever loss by the Raiders to the Bengals at home (10–1).

==== Week 2: vs. Baltimore Ravens ====
Week Two: Baltimore Ravens at Oakland Raiders – Game summary

Quarter	1	2	3	4	Total
Ravens	10	10	0	13	**33**
**Raiders**	10	10	10	7	**37**

at O.co Coliseum, Oakland, California

- Date: September 20
- Game time: 1:05 p.m. PDT
- Game weather: 80 °F (27 °C), sunny
- Game attendance: 53,500
- Referee: Pete Morelli
- TV announcers (CBS): Spero Dedes and Solomon Wilcots
- Recap, Gamebook

Game information

**First quarter**

- OAK – Amari Cooper 68 yard touchdown reception from Derek Carr, Sebastian Janikowski kick. OAK 7 – BAL 0
- OAK – Janikowski 23 yard FG. OAK 10 – BAL 0
- BAL – Justin Tucker 22 yard FG. OAK 10 – BAL 3
- BAL – Crockett Gillmore 26 yard touchdown reception from Joe Flacco, Tucker kick. OAK 10 – BAL 10

**Second quarter**

- OAK – Latavius Murray 1 yard touchdown run, Janikowski kick. OAK 17 – BAL 10
- BAL – Gilmore 9 yard touchdown reception from Flacco, Tucker kick. OAK 17 – BAL 17
- OAK – Janikowski 46 yard FG. OAK 20 – BAL 17
- BAL – Tucker 21 yard FG. OAK 20 – BAL 20

**Third quarter**

- OAK – Janikowski 48 yard FG. OAK 23 – BAL 20
- OAK – Michael Crabtree 29 yard touchdown reception from Carr, Janikowski kick. OAK 30 – BAL 20

**Fourth quarter**

- BAL – Tucker 37 yard FG. OAK 30 – BAL 23
- BAL – Lorenzo Taliaferro 7 yard touchdown run, Tucker kick. OAK 30 – BAL 30
- BAL – Tucker 31 yard FG. BAL 33 – OAK 30
- OAK – Seth Roberts 12 yard touchdown reception from Carr, Janikowski kick. OAK 37 – BAL 33

**Top passers**

- BAL – Joe Flacco – 32–45, 384 YDS, 2 TD, 1 INT
- OAK – Derek Carr – 30–46, 351 YDS, 3 TD, 1 INT

**Top rushers**

- BAL – Justin Forsett – 15 ATT, 28 YDS
- OAK – Latavius Murray – 15 ATT, 65 YDS, 1 TD

**Top receivers**

- BAL – Steve Smith – 10 REC, 150 YDS,
- OAK – Michael Crabtree – 9 REC, 111 YDS, 1 TD

**Top tacklers**

- BAL – CJ Mosley – 8
- OAK – Curtis Lofton, Malcolm Smith – 7

A high-scoring first half, highlighted by Amari Cooper's 68-yard touchdown catch resulted in a 20–20 tie at halftime. A field goal and touchdown catch by Michael Crabtree put the Raiders up 10 going in the fourth quarter. However, Baltimore stormed back with 13 points to take the lead. A late interception thrown by Derek Carr appeared to be the end, but with 30 seconds left in regulation, Carr threw a touchdown pass to Seth Roberts to take the lead. With the win, the Raiders improved to 1–1 on the season and 2–7 all-time against the Ravens.

==== Week 3: at Cleveland Browns ====
Week Three: Oakland Raiders at Cleveland Browns – Game summary

Quarter	1	2	3	4	Total
**Raiders**	3	14	3	7	**27**
Browns	0	3	7	10	**20**

at FirstEnergy Stadium, Cleveland, Ohio

- Date: September 27
- Game time: 1:00 p.m. EDT/10:00 a.m. PDT
- Game weather: 75 °F (24 °C), partly cloudy
- Game attendance: 67,431
- Referee: Clete Blakeman
- TV announcers (CBS): Carter Blackburn and Chris Simms
- Recap, Gamebook

Game information

**First quarter**

- OAK – Sebastian Janikowski 23 yard FG. OAK 3 - CLE 0

**Second quarter**

- OAK - Andre Holmes 3 yard pass from Derek Carr, Janikowski made 1 point conversion. OAK 10 - CLE 0
- CLE - Travis Coons 24 yard FG. OAK 10 - CLE 3
- OAK - Seth Roberts 13 yard reception from Carr, Janikowski made 1 point conversion. OAK 17 - CLE - 3

**Third quarter**

- OAK - Janikowski 35 yard FG. OAK 20 - CLE 3
- CLE - Gary Barnidge 28 yard reception from Josh McCown, Coons made 1 point conversion. OAK 20 - CLE 10

**Fourth quarter**

- OAK - Latavius Murray 6 yard rush, Jankowski made 1 point conversion. OAK 27 - CLE 10
- CLE - Coons 41 yard FG. OAK 27 - CLE 13
- CLE - Travis Benjamin 4 yard reception from McCown, Coons kick. OAK 27 - CLE 20

**Top passers**

- OAK – Derek Carr
- CLE – Josh McCown

**Top rushers**

- OAK – Latavius Murray
- CLE – Isaiah Crowell

**Top receivers**

- OAK – Amari Cooper
- CLE – Gary Barnidge

**Top tacklers**

- OAK – Malcolm Smith
- CLE – Karlos Dansby

The Raiders jumped out early on the Browns with two touchdown passes by Carr in the first half. A Latavius Murray touchdown run early in the fourth quarter seemed to seal it for the Raiders. However, the Browns made a comeback late, but Charles Woodson intercepted Josh McCown's pass in the final minute to seal the win. The Raiders snapped an 11-game road losing streak with the win and improved to 2–1 on the season. It was also quarterback Derek Carr's first win away from Oakland.

==== Week 4 at Bears ====
Week Four: Oakland Raiders (2–1) at Chicago Bears (0–3)

Quarter	1	2	3	4	Total
Raiders	0	14	3	3	**20**
Bears	6	10	0	6	**22**

at Soldier Field • Chicago, Illinois

- Date: October 4
- Game time: 12:00 p.m. CDT
- Game weather: Cloudy • 55 °F (13 °C) • Wind NE 12 miles per hour (19 km/h; 10 kn)
- Game attendance: 62,409
- Referee: Jeff Triplette
- TV announcers (CBS): Greg Gumbel, Trent Green, and Jamie Erdahl
- Gamebook

Game information

Raiders

- Derek Carr
  20/33, 196 Yds, 2 TD, INT
- Latavius Murray
  15 Rush, 49 Yds
- Michael Crabtree
  5 Rec, 80 Yds

Bears

- Jay Cutler
  28/43, 281 Yds, 2 TD, INT
- Matt Forte
  25 Rush, 91 Yds
- Martellus Bennett
  11 Rec, 83 Yds, TD

Two first-half touchdown passes by Carr gave the Raiders a one-point lead at the half. The teams exchanged field goals in the second half. Following a late Jay Cutler interception, the Raiders took a late lead on a Sebastian Janikowski field goal with just over two minutes remaining. However, the Bears stormed down the field, and Robbie Gould hit a 49-yard field goal with two seconds remaining to seal the win. With the loss, the Raiders dropped to 2–2 on the season.

Scoring summary

Quarter	Time	Drive			Team	Scoring information	Score	
Quarter	Time	Plays	Yards	TOP	Team	Scoring information	OAK	CHI
1	10:57	8	80	4:03	Bears	Eddie Royal 7-yard touchdown reception from Jay Cutler, Robbie Gould kick no good (blocked)	0	6
2	11:10	7	51	3:38	Raiders	Amari Cooper 26-yard touchdown reception from Derek Carr, Sebastian Janikowski kick good	7	6
2	7:12	3	25	1:05	Raiders	Roy Helu 4-yard touchdown reception from Derek Carr, Sebastian Janikowski kick good	14	6
2	3:30	7	80	3:42	Bears	Martellus Bennett 5-yard touchdown reception from Jay Cutler, Robbie Gould kick good	14	13
2	1:26	6	14	1:52	Bears	19-yard field goal by Robbie Gould	14	16
3	10:53	7	35	2:28	Raiders	29-yard field goal by Sebastian Janikowski	17	16
4	13:01	10	54	5:01	Bears	54-yard field goal by Robbie Gould	17	19
4	2:05	11	68	4:36	Raiders	41-yard field goal by Sebastian Janikowski	20	19
4	0:02	12	48	2:03	Bears	49-yard field goal by Robbie Gould	20	22
"TOP" = time of possession. For other American football terms, see Glossary of American football.							20	22

==== Week 5: vs. Denver Broncos ====
Week Five: Denver Broncos at Oakland Raiders – Game summary

Quarter	1	2	3	4	Total
**Broncos**	0	3	6	7	**16**
Raiders	0	7	0	3	**10**

at O.co Coliseum, Oakland, California

- Date: October 11
- Game time: 1:25 p.m. PDT
- Game weather: 72 °F (22 °C), sunny
- Game attendance: 54,500
- Referee: John Hussey
- TV announcers (CBS): Greg Gumbel, Trent Green and Jamie Erdahl
- Recap, Gamebook

Game information

**First quarter** **Second quarter**

- DEN - Brandon McManus 25 yard FG. DEN 3 - OAK 0
- OAK - Marcel Reece 3 yard reception from Derek Carr, Sebastian Janikowski made 1 point conversion. OAK 7 - DEN 3

**Third quarter**

- DEN - McManus 20 yard FG. OAK 7 - DEN 6
- DEN - McMcanus 52 yard FG. DEN 9 - OAK 7

**Fourth quarter**

- DEN - Chris Harris 74 yard interception return, McManus made 1 point conversion. DEN 16 - OAK 7
- OAK - Janikowski 50 yard FG. DEN 16 - OAK 10

**Top passers**

- DEN – Peyton Manning
- OAK – Derek Carr

**Top rushers**

- DEN – C. J. Anderson
- OAK – Latavius Murray

**Top receivers**

- DEN – Emmanuel Sanders
- OAK – Michael Crabtree

**Top tacklers**

- DEN – Brandon Marshall, Danny Trevathan
- OAK – D. J. Hayden, Neiko Thorpe

Charles Woodson said days prior to Week 5 that he always wanted to intercept a pass from Peyton Manning as he had not accomplished this feat in his entire 18-year career. He lived up to his word, intercepting Manning twice, but it was Carr's interception and the resulting return for a touchdown by Chris Harris that was the difference in the game. The Raiders fell to the Broncos 16–10 as the team dropped to 2–3 going into their bye week.

==== Week 7: at San Diego Chargers ====
Week Seven: Oakland Raiders at San Diego Chargers – Game summary

Quarter	1	2	3	4	Total
**Raiders**	10	20	7	0	**37**
Chargers	3	3	0	23	**29**

at Qualcomm Stadium, San Diego, California

- Date: October 25
- Game time: 1:05 p.m. PDT
- Game weather: 77 °F (25 °C), sunny
- Game attendance: 67,542
- Referee: Jerome Boger
- TV announcers (CBS): Andrew Catalon, Steve Beuerlein and Steve Tasker
- Recap, Gamebook

Game information

**First quarter**

- OAK - Latavius Murray 1 yard rush, Sebastian Janikowski made 1 point conversion. OAK 7 - SD 0
- OAK - Janikowski 29 yard FG. OAK 10 - SD 0
- SD - Josh Lambo 40 yard FG. OAK - SD 3

**Second quarter**

- OAK - Clive Walford 23 yard reception from Derek Carr, Janikowski made 1 point conversion. OAK 17 - SD 3
- OAK - Janikowski 32 yard FG. OAK 20 - SD 3
- OAK - Janikowski 32 yard FG. OAK 23 - SD 3
- OAK - Amari Cooper 52 yard reception from Carr, Janikowski made 1 point conversion. OAK 30 - SD 3
- SD - Lambo 44 yard FG. OAK 30 - SD 6

**Third quarter**

- OAK - Michael Crabtree 25 yard pass from Carr, Janikowski made 1 point conversion. OAK 37 - SD 6

**Fourth quarter**

- SD - Ladarius Green 31 yard reception from Philip Rivers, Lambo made 1 point conversion. OAK 37 - SD 13
- SD - Danny Woodhead 8 yard pass from Rivers, Green reception from Rivers for 2 point conversion. OAK 37 - SD 21
- SD - Woodhead 6 yard pass from Rivers, Green reception from Rivers for 2 point conversion. OAK 37 - SD 29

**Top passers**

- OAK – Derek Carr
- SD – Philip Rivers

**Top rushers**

- OAK – Latavius Murray
- SD – Branden Oliver

**Top receivers**

- OAK – Amari Cooper
- SD – Danny Woodhead

**Top tacklers**

- OAK – Malcolm Smith
- SD – Corey Liuget

The Raiders jumped out to an early lead on the Chargers scoring on their first seven possessions. Three Janikowski field goals and two Carr touchdown passes led the way to a 30–6 lead at the half. The Chargers attempted a comeback in the fourth quarter, but it was too little too late as the Raiders won 37–29. With the win, the Raiders improved to 3–3 on the season.

==== Week 8: vs. New York Jets ====
Week Eight: New York Jets at Oakland Raiders – Game summary

Quarter	1	2	3	4	Total
Jets	3	3	7	7	**20**
**Raiders**	7	14	10	3	**34**

at O.co Coliseum, Oakland, California

- Date: November 1
- Game time: 1:05 p.m. PST
- Game weather: 68 °F (20 °C), partly cloudy
- Game attendance: 54,700
- Referee: Ed Hochuli
- TV announcers (CBS): Kevin Harlan, Rich Gannon and Alex Flanagan
- Recap, Gamebook

Game information

**First quarter**

- NYJ - Nick Folk 40 yard FG. NYJ 3 - OAK 0
- OAK - Andre Holmes 5 yard reception from Derek Carr, Sebastian Janikowski made 1 point conversion. OAK 7 - NYJ 3

**Second quarter**

- OAK - Michael Crabtree 36 yard reception from Carr, Janikowski made 1 point conversion. OAK 14 - NYJ 3
- OAK - Holmes 49 yard reception from Carr, Janikowski made 1 point conversion. OAK 21 - NYJ 3
- NYJ - Folk 38 yard FG. OAK 21 - NYJ 6

**Third quarter**

- OAK - Taiwan Jones 5 9 yard reception from Carr, Janikowski made 1 point conversion. OAK 28 - NYJ 6
- NYJ - Eric Decker 4 yard reception from Geno Smith, Folk made 1 point conversion. OAK 28 - NYJ 13
- OAK - Janikowski 52 yard FG. OAK 31 - NYJ 13

**Fourth quarter**

- OAK - Janikowsk 47 yard FG., OAK 34 - NYJ 13
- NYJ - Kellen Davis 1 yard reception from Smith. Folk made 1 point conversion. OAK 34 - NYJ 20

**Top passers**

- NYJ – Geno Smith
- OAK – Derek Carr

**Top rushers**

- NYJ – Chris Ivory
- OAK – Latavius Murray

**Top receivers**

- NYJ – Brandon Marshall
- OAK – Michael Crabtree

**Top tacklers**

- NYJ – David Harris, Muhammad Wilkerson
- OAK – David Amerson, Neiko Thorpe

Carr threw four touchdown passes, three in the first half, and totaled 333 yard passing against the Jets' highly ranked defense. The Raiders took a 21–6 lead half time. Murray added 113 yards on the ground as the Raiders won easily 34–20. With the win, the Raiders improved to 4–3, marking the first time since 2011 the Raiders had a winning record this late in the season.

==== Week 9: at Pittsburgh Steelers ====
Week Nine: Oakland Raiders at Pittsburgh Steelers – Game summary

Quarter	1	2	3	4	Total
Raiders	7	7	7	14	**35**
**Steelers**	3	18	0	17	**38**

at Heinz Field, Pittsburgh, Pennsylvania

- Date: November 8
- Game time: 1:00 p.m. EST/10:00 a.m. PST
- Game weather: 54 °F (12 °C), sunny
- Game attendance: 65,520
- Referee: Bill Vinovich
- TV announcers (CBS): Ian Eagle, Dan Fouts and Evan Washburn
- Recap, Gamebook

Game information

**First quarter**

- OAK - Michael Crabtree 22 yard reception from Derek Carr, Sebastian Janikowski made 1 point conversion. OAK 7 - PIT 0
- PIT - Chris Boswell 34 yard FG. OAK 7 - PIT 3

**Second quarter**

- PIT - DeAngelo Williams 3 yard rush, Williams reception from Ben Roethlisberger for 2 point conversion. PIT 11 - OAK 7
- OAK - Amari Cooper 15 yard pass from Carr, Janikowski made 1 point conversion. OAK 14 - PIT 11 -
- PIT - Williams 3 yard rush, Boswell made 1 point conversion. PIT 18 - OAK 14
- PIT - Boswell 38 yard FG. PIT 21 - OAK 14

**Third quarter**

- OAK - Clive Walford 1 yard reception from Carr, Janikowski made 1 point conversion. PIT 21 - OAK 21

**Fourth quarter**

- PIT - Martavis Bryant 14 yard reception from Roethlisberger, Boswell made 1 point conversion. PIT 28 - OAK 21
- PIT - Jesse James 4 yard reception from Roethlisberger, Boswell made 1 point conversion. PIT 35 - OAK 28
- OAK - Jamize Olawale 19 yard rush, Janikowski made 1 point conversion. PIT 35 - OAK 28
- OAK - Crabtree 38 yard pass from Carr, Janikowski made 1 point conversion. PIT 35 - OAK 35
- PIT - Boswell 18 yard FG. PIT 38 - OAK 35

**Top passers**

- OAK – Derek Carr
- PIT – Ben Roethlisberger

**Top rushers**

- OAK – Latavius Murray
- PIT – DeAngelo Williams

**Top receivers**

- OAK – Michael Crabtree
- PIT – Antonio Brown

**Top tacklers**

- OAK – D.J. Hayden
- PIT – Antwon Blake

Carr threw for 301 yards with four touchdowns and one interception and Murray ran for 96 yards before leaving with concussion-like symptoms. But, the Raiders defense could not stop Antonio Brown and DeAngelo Williams. The two Steelers combined for 531 total yards. Despite Ben Roethlisberger leaving the game in the fourth quarter with a foot injury, the Steelers could not be stopped. Williams led the Steelers to the Raiders one-yard line before the winning field goal sailed through the uprights as time expired. With the loss, the Raiders dropped to 4–4 and they finished 2-2 against the AFC North.

==== Week 10: vs. Minnesota Vikings ====
Week Ten: Minnesota Vikings at Oakland Raiders – Game summary

Quarter	1	2	3	4	Total
**Vikings**	10	10	0	10	**30**
Raiders	0	14	0	0	**14**

at O.co Coliseum, Oakland, California

- Date: November 15
- Game time: 1:05 p.m. PST
- Game weather: 62 °F (17 °C), sunny
- Game attendance: 54,700
- Referee: Tony Corrente
- TV announcers (Fox): Chris Myers, Ronde Barber and Holly Sonders
- Recap, Gamebook

Game information

**First quarter**

- MIN – Rhett Ellison 11 yard reception from Teddy Bridgewater, Blair Walsh kick. MIN 7 – OAK 0
- MIN – Walsh 20 yard FG. MIN 10 – OAK 0

**Second quarter**

- MIN – Walsh 38 yard FG. MIN 13 – OAK 0
- OAK – Clive Walford 10 yard reception from Derek Carr, Sebastian Janikowski kick. MIN 13 – OAK 7
- OAK – Andre Holmes 34 yard reception from Carr, Janikowski kick. OAK 14 – MIN 13
- MIN – Cordarrelle Patterson 93 yard kickoff return, Walsh kick. MIN 20 – OAK 14

**Third quarter**
**Fourth quarter**

- MIN – Walsh 34 yard FG. MIN 23 – OAK 14
- MIN – Adrian Peterson 80 yard rush, Walsh kick. MIN 30 – OAK 14

**Top passers**

- MIN – Teddy Bridgewater – 14–22, 140 yards, 1 TD
- OAK – Derek Carr – 29–43 302 yards, 2 TD, 2 INT

**Top rushers**

- MIN – Adrian Peterson – 26 rushes, 203 yards, TD
- OAK – Latavius Murray – 12 rushes 48 yards

**Top receivers**

- MIN – Stefon Diggs – 2 rec, 46 yards
- OAK – Michael Crabtree – 5 rec, 55 yards

**Top tacklers**

- MIN – Captain Munnerlyn – 7 tackles
- OAK – Mario Edwards Jr. – 8 tackles

Minnesota paid a visit to Oakland for Week 10. Adrian Peterson tied a record for most 200-yard rushing games by rushing for 203 yards against the Raiders beleaguered rush defense. Derek Carr threw two touchdown passes, but also two interceptions. Peterson's 80 yard touchdown run with less than two minutes remaining sealed the victory for the Vikings. The Raiders fell to 4–5 on the season.

==== Week 11: at Detroit Lions ====
Week Eleven: Oakland Raiders at Detroit Lions – Game summary

Quarter	1	2	3	4	Total
Raiders	0	0	13	0	**13**
**Lions**	6	3	0	9	**18**

at Ford Field, Detroit, Michigan

- Date: November 22
- Game time: 1:00 p.m. EST/10:00 a.m. PST
- Game weather: Played indoors (dome stadium)
- Game attendance: 60,202
- Referee: Clete Blakeman
- TV announcers (CBS): Andrew Catalon, Steve Beuerlein and Steve Tasker
- Recap, Gamebook

Game information

**First quarter**

- Matt Prater 29 yard FG. DET 3 – OAK 0
- Prater 41 yard fg. det 6 – OAK 0

**Second quarter**

- Prater 51 yard fg. det 9 – OAK 0

**Third quarter**

- Latavius Murray 1 yard rush, Sebastian Janikowski kick. DET 9 – OAK 7
- Janikowski 48 yard fg. oak 10 – DET 9
- Janikowski 56 yard fg. oak 13 – DET 9

**Fourth quarter**

- DET Matthew Stafford 5 yard rush, Prater kick. DET 16 - OAK 13
- DET Safety, Donald Penn penalty in end zone. DET 18 - OAK 13

**Top passers**

- OAK – Derek Carr – 13–25, 169 yards
- DET – Matthew Stafford – 22–35, 282 yards

**Top rushers**

- OAK – Latavius Murray – 13 rushes, 28 yards
- DET – Ameer Abdullah – 12 rushes, 44 yards

**Top receivers**

- OAK – Seth Roberts – 2 rec, 54 yards
- DET – Calvin Johnson – 5 rec, 88 yards

**Top tacklers**

- OAK – Khalil Mack – 8 tackles
- DET – Four with 4 tackles

Looking to avoid a season-high three-game losing streak, the Raiders visited Detroit to face the 2–7 Lions. A defensive struggle in the first half led to three Detroit field goals and 9–0 deficit for Oakland. The Raiders came alive in third quarter, scoring 13 points on two Janikowski field goals and a Murray touchdown run. However, the Lions scored late on a Matthew Stafford touchdown run and the Raiders fell to 4–6.

==== Week 12: at Tennessee Titans ====
Week Twelve: Oakland Raiders at Tennessee Titans – Game summary

Quarter	1	2	3	4	Total
**Raiders**	7	3	7	7	**24**
Titans	6	0	8	7	**21**

at Nissan Stadium, Nashville, Tennessee

- Date: November 29
- Game time: 12:00 p.m. CST/10:00 a.m. PST
- Game weather: 56 °F (13 °C), rain
- Game attendance: 58,075
- Referee: Jeff Triplette
- TV announcers (CBS): Greg Gumbel, Trent Green and Jamie Erdahl
- Recap, Gamebook

Game information

**First quarter**

- Craig Stevens 20 yard reception from Marcus Mariota, kick blocked. TEN 6 – OAK 0
- Michael Crabtree 7 yard reception from Derek Carr, Sebastian Janikowski kick. OAK 7 – TEN 6

**Second quarter**

- Janikowski 24 yard fg. oak 10 – TEN 6

**Third quarter**

- Seth Roberts 10 yard reception from Carr, Janikowski kick. OAK 17 – TEN 6
- Harry Douglas 13 yard reception from Mariota, Dorial Green-Beckham reception from Mariota for 2 PTS. OAK 17 – TEN 14

**Fourth quarter**

- Jalston Fowler 1 yard reception from Mariota, Ryan Succop kick. TEN 21 – OAK 17
- Roberts 12 yard reception from carr, janikowski kick. oak 24 – TEN 21

**Top passers**

- OAK – Derek Carr – 24–37, 330 yards, 3 TD
- TEN – Marcus Mariota – 17–37, 218 yards, 3 TD, 2 INT

**Top rushers**

- OAK – Latavius Murray – 22 rushes, 59 yards
- TEN – Antonio Andrews – 11 rushes, 23 yards

**Top receivers**

- OAK – Amari Cooper – 7 rec, 115 yards
- TEN – Delanie Walker – 6 rec, 91 yards

**Top tacklers**

- OAK – Malcolm Smith – 8 tackles
- TEN – Avery Williamson – 7 tackles

The Raiders started well in Tennessee, taking a 13–6 lead at halftime over the Titans on a touchdown pass from Carr to Crabtree. The Raiders jumped out early in the third quarter on touchdown pass to Roberts. However, the Titans rallied scoring 15 points on two Marcus Mariota touchdown passes. Oakland drove late in the game looking for the winning score and appeared to have been stopped on an incomplete pass in the end zone on fourth down. However, the Titans were called for holding and Carr hit Roberts for the game-clinching touchdown two play later. The Raiders halted their three-game losing streak and moved to 5–6 on the season.

==== Week 13: vs. Kansas City Chiefs ====
Week Thirteen: Kansas City Chiefs at Oakland Raiders – Game summary

Quarter	1	2	3	4	Total
**Chiefs**	7	0	7	20	**34**
Raiders	7	7	6	0	**20**

at O.co Coliseum, Oakland, California

- Date: December 6
- Game time: 1:05 p.m. PST
- Game weather: 57 °F (14 °C), overcast
- Game attendance: 55,010
- Referee: Craig Wrolstad
- TV announcers (CBS): Greg Gumbel, Trent Green and Jamie Erdahl
- Recap, Gamebook

Game information

**First quarter** **Second quarter** **Third quarter** **Fourth quarter**

**Top passers**

- KC – Alex Smith
- OAK – Derek Carr

**Top rushers**

- KC –
- OAK –

**Top receivers**

- KC –
- OAK –

**Top tacklers**

- KC –
- OAK –

With the loss, the Raiders fell to 5-7.

==== Week 14: at Denver Broncos ====
Week Fourteen: Oakland Raiders at Denver Broncos – Game summary

Quarter	1	2	3	4	Total
**Raiders**	0	0	9	6	**15**
Broncos	6	6	0	0	**12**

at Sports Authority Field at Mile High, Denver, Colorado

- Date: December 13
- Game time: 2:05 p.m. MST/1:05 p.m. PST
- Game weather: 45 °F (7 °C), partly cloudy
- Game attendance: 76,824
- Referee: Bill Vinovich
- TV announcers (CBS): Ian Eagle, Dan Fouts and Evan Washburn
- Recap, Gamebook

Game information

**First quarter** **Second quarter** **Third quarter** **Fourth quarter**

**Top passers**

- OAK –
- DEN –

**Top rushers**

- OAK –
- DEN –

**Top receivers**

- OAK –
- DEN –

**Top tacklers**

- OAK –
- DEN –

Khalil Mack tied the Oakland Raiders franchise record for most sacks in a game with 5 sacks in the Raiders' hard-fought 15-12 victory over the Broncos at Mile High. It also snapped their 8-game losing streak to the Broncos.

==== Week 15: vs. Green Bay Packers ====
Week Fifteen: Green Bay Packers at Oakland Raiders – Game summary

Quarter	1	2	3	4	Total
**Packers**	14	0	10	6	**30**
Raiders	0	13	7	0	**20**

at O.co Coliseum, Oakland, California

- Date: December 20
- Game time: 1:05 p.m. PST
- Game weather: 54 °F (12 °C), cloudy
- Game attendance: 55,087
- Referee: Walt Anderson
- TV announcers (Fox): Chris Myers, Ronde Barber and Jennifer Hale
- Recap, Gamebook

Game information

**First quarter** **Second quarter** **Third quarter** **Fourth quarter**

**Top passers**

- GB –
- OAK –

**Top rushers**

- GB –
- OAK –

**Top receivers**

- GB –
- OAK –

**Top tacklers**

- GB –
- OAK –

With the loss, the Raiders fell to 6-8 and were officially eliminated from playoff contention for the 14th straight year. The Raiders also finished 0-4 against the NFC North.

==== Week 16: vs. San Diego Chargers ====
Week Sixteen: San Diego Chargers at Oakland Raiders – Game summary

Quarter	1	2	3	4	OT	Total
Chargers	7	10	0	3	0	**20**
**Raiders**	7	3	2	8	3	**23**

at O.co Coliseum, Oakland, California

- Date: December 24
- Game time: 5:25 p.m. PST
- Game weather: 47 °F (8 °C), partly cloudy
- Game attendance: 54,400
- Referee: Carl Cheffers
- TV announcers (NFLN): Jim Nantz, Phil Simms and Tracy Wolfson
- Recap, Gamebook

Game information

**First quarter** **Second quarter** **Third quarter** **Fourth quarter**

**Top passers**

- SD –
- OAK –

**Top rushers**

- SD –
- OAK –

**Top receivers**

- SD –
- OAK –

**Top tacklers**

- SD –
- OAK –

In Charles Woodson's last game at the Coliseum, the game was hard-fought and the Raiders won 23-20 in an overtime thriller in order to go to 7-8 (3-5 at home) in what could be their final game in Oakland. Woodson addressed to Oakland's home crowd after the game saying, "I will never leave you".

==== Week 17: at Kansas City Chiefs ====
Week Seventeen: Oakland Raiders at Kansas City Chiefs – Game summary

Quarter	1	2	3	4	Total
Raiders	0	10	0	7	**17**
**Chiefs**	14	0	9	0	**23**

at Arrowhead Stadium, Kansas City, Missouri

- Date: January 3, 2016
- Game time: 3:25 p.m. CST/1:25 p.m. PST
- Game weather: 37 °F (3 °C), sunny
- Game attendance: 76,114
- Referee: Tony Corrente
- TV announcers (Fox): Kevin Burkhardt, John Lynch and Pam Oliver
- Recap, Gamebook

Game information

**First quarter** **Second quarter** **Third quarter** **Fourth quarter**

**Top passers**

- OAK –
- KC –

**Top rushers**

- OAK –
- KC –

**Top receivers**

- OAK –
- KC –

**Top tacklers**

- OAK –
- KC –

This was Charles Woodson's last game in the NFL. With the loss, the Raiders ended their season 7-9 (4-4 on the road and 3-3 against the AFC West) and clinched their 14th straight losing season.

== Standings ==
=== Division ===
AFC West
	W	L	T	PCT	DIV	CONF	PF	PA	STK
^{(1)} Denver Broncos	12	4	0	.750	4–2	8–4	355	296	W2
^{(5)} Kansas City Chiefs	11	5	0	.688	5–1	10–2	405	287	W10
Oakland Raiders	7	9	0	.438	3–3	7–5	359	399	L1
San Diego Chargers	4	12	0	.250	0–6	3–9	320	398	L2

=== Conference ===
AFC
#	Team	Division	W	L	T	PCT	DIV	CONF	SOS	SOV	STK
Division Leaders
1 (Note: Denver finished ahead of New England and Cincinnati for the No. 1 seed based on head-to-head sweep. New England finished ahead of Cincinnati for the No. 2 seed based on record vs. common opponents — New England's cumulative record against Buffalo, Denver, Houston and Pittsburgh was 4–1, while Cincinnati's cumulative record against the same four teams was 2–3.)	Denver Broncos	West	12	4	0	.750	4–2	8–4	.500	.479	W2
2	New England Patriots	East	12	4	0	.750	4–2	9–3	.473	.448	L2
3	Cincinnati Bengals	North	12	4	0	.750	5–1	9–3	.477	.406	W1
4	Houston Texans	South	9	7	0	.563	5–1	7–5	.496	.410	W3
Wild Cards
5	Kansas City Chiefs	West	11	5	0	.688	5–1	10–2	.496	.432	W10
6 (Note: Pittsburgh finished ahead of the New York Jets for the No. 6 seed and qualified for the last playoff spot based on record vs. common opponents — Pittsburgh's cumulative record against Cleveland, Indianapolis, New England and Oakland was 4–1, while the Jets' cumulative record against the same four teams was 3–2.)	Pittsburgh Steelers	North	10	6	0	.625	3–3	7–5	.504	.463	W1
Did not qualify for the postseason
7	New York Jets	East	10	6	0	.625	3–3	7–5	.441	.388	L1
8 (Note: Buffalo finished ahead of Indianapolis based on head-to-head victory.)	Buffalo Bills	East	8	8	0	.500	4–2	7–5	.508	.438	W2
9	Indianapolis Colts	South	8	8	0	.500	4–2	6–6	.500	.406	W2
10	Oakland Raiders	West	7	9	0	.438	3–3	7–5	.512	.366	L1
11	Miami Dolphins	East	6	10	0	.375	1–5	4–8	.469	.469	W2
12 (Note: Jacksonville finished ahead of Baltimore based on head-to-head victory.)	Jacksonville Jaguars	South	5	11	0	.313	2–4	5–7	.473	.375	L3
13	Baltimore Ravens	North	5	11	0	.313	3–3	4–8	.508	.425	L1
14	San Diego Chargers	West	4	12	0	.250	0–6	3–9	.527	.328	L2
15 (Note: Cleveland finished ahead of Tennessee based on head-to-head victory.)	Cleveland Browns	North	3	13	0	.188	1–5	2–10	.531	.271	L3
16	Tennessee Titans	South	3	13	0	.188	1–5	1–11	.492	.375	L4
Tiebreakers (Note: When breaking ties for three or more teams under the NFL's rules, they are first broken within divisions, then comparing only the highest ranked remaining team from each division.)
