= 2018 Oakland Raiders season =

59th season in franchise history

- Owner: Mark Davis
- General manager: Reggie McKenzie (fired Week 14); Shaun Herock (Week 15-17)
- Head coach: Jon Gruden
- Home stadium: Oakland–Alameda County Coliseum

Results
- Record: 4–12
- Division place: 4th AFC West
- Playoffs: Did not qualify
- Pro Bowlers: TE Jared Cook

Uniform
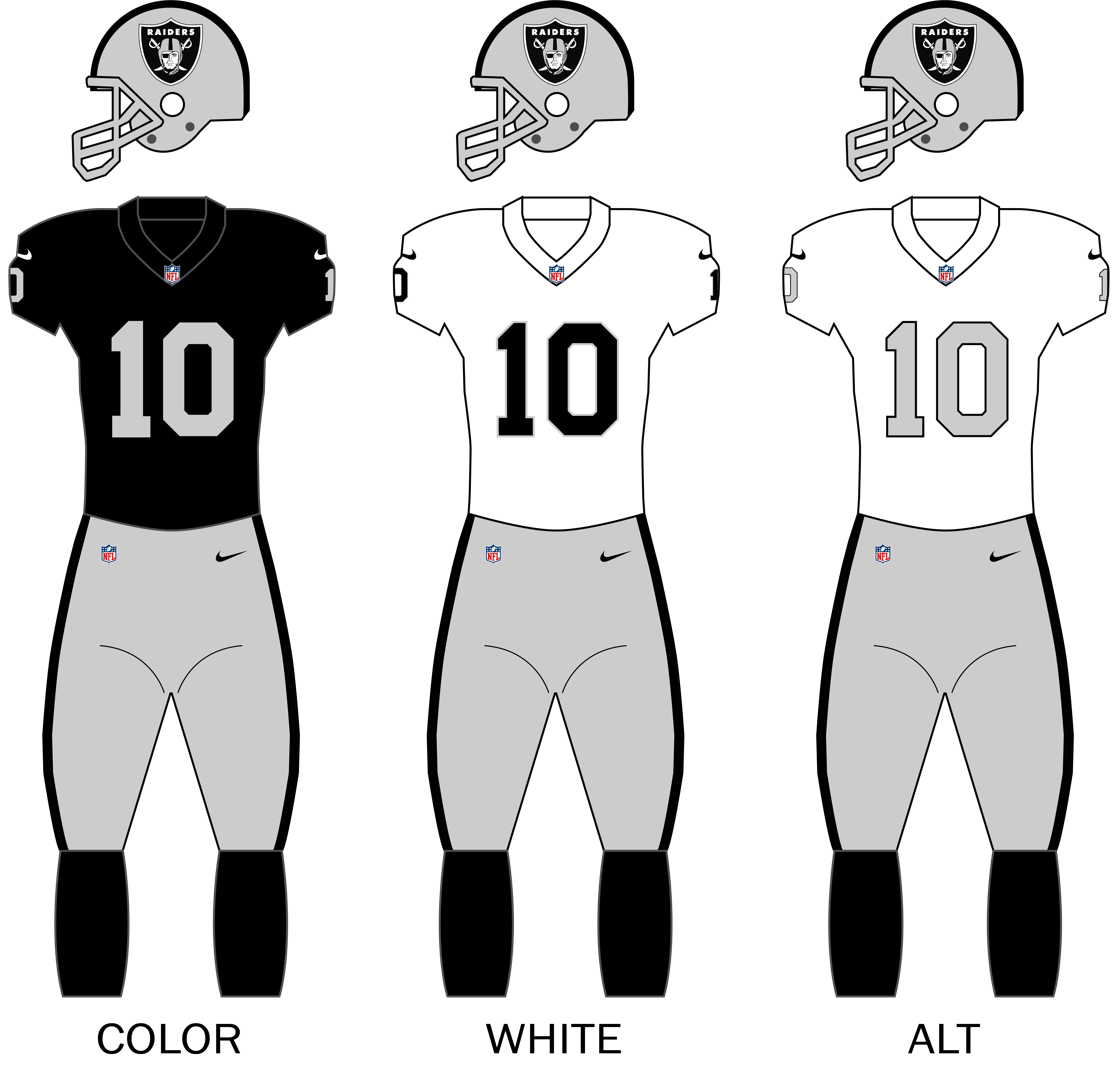

The 2018 season was the Oakland Raiders' 49th in the National Football League (NFL), their 59th overall, their 24th since their return to Oakland, and their first under head coach Jon Gruden since his rehiring by the organization (fifth overall). The Raiders finished the season with a 4–12 record, failing to improve upon their previous season's record of 6–10, and their worst since 2014.

With a loss to the Kansas City Chiefs in Week 13, the Raiders were eliminated from playoff contention for the second consecutive season. With their week 15 loss to the Bengals, the Raiders failed to improve their record from the previous season. The loss also secured their spot at last in the AFC West.

On December 10, the Raiders fired general manager Reggie McKenzie who had been with the Raiders since 2012.

This was the first time since 1999 that Sebastian Janikowski was not on the opening day roster, as his contract was not renewed following the previous season where he didn't play due to a back injury.

== Stadium issues ==
Although the league approved the Raiders' eventual relocation to Las Vegas on March 27, 2017, the team maintained its lease at the Oakland–Alameda County Coliseum and used the stadium for the 2018 season while the team's new stadium in Las Vegas was under construction. Initially in April 2017, the operators of the Coliseum stated they would be unwilling to sign a lease extension for the team to play at the stadium while their new venue in Las Vegas was being built; however by September of that year, the Coliseum operators expressed willingness to negotiate, but insisted on concessions to compensate for the million-dollar deficit the Coliseum runs by hosting Raiders games. Owner Mark Davis stated he preferred to stay in Oakland for the 2019 season but was considering other options, including Las Vegas's Sam Boyd Stadium, Berkeley's California Memorial Stadium, Mackay Stadium in Reno, Nevada; the San Francisco 49ers's Levi's Stadium and even the Alamodome in San Antonio, Texas, a venue thought to have been ruled out in 2014. Davis acknowledged that if fans failed to support the team similarly to the 1996 Houston Oilers, it could hasten the relocation. Team management also indicated they would relocate after 2018 if there were any lawsuits filed against the team; the city of Oakland sued the Raiders and all other teams in the league on December 11, 2018, however the Raiders remained in Oakland for the final year despite the lawsuit.

== Offseason ==
=== Coaching changes ===
On January 6, 2018, the Raiders hired their former head coach, Jon Gruden, who returned to the Raiders and coaching from ESPN's Monday Night Football. Gruden received a 10-year, $100-million contract to return to the Raiders. Gruden last coached in the NFL in 2008 with the Tampa Bay Buccaneers and last coached the Raiders in 2001. At the press conference announcing the hiring of Gruden on January 9, Gruden announced that Los Angeles Rams quarterbacks coach Greg Olson had been hired as offensive coordinator, though Gruden would call plays, while former Cincinnati Bengals defensive coordinator Paul Guenther was hired as the new defensive coordinator. Gruden also announced that former Tampa Bay Buccaneers and Dallas Cowboys special teams coordinator Rich Bisaccia was hired to serve as special teams coordinator. On January 29, the Raiders named Brian Callahan, son of their former head coach Bill Callahan, as the new quarterbacks coach.

=== Khalil Mack holdout and trade to Chicago ===
On September 1, 2018, the Raiders traded defensive star Khalil Mack along with their 2020 2nd round pick to the Chicago Bears for two first round picks (RB Josh Jacobs and CB Damon Arnette), a 2019 6th round pick, and a 2020 3rd round pick, after he had held out of training camp.

=== Free agent signings ===
Position	Player	Age	2017 Team	Contract
WR	Jordy Nelson	32	Green Bay Packers	2 years, $15 million
RB	Doug Martin	29	Tampa Bay Buccaneers	1 year, $1.475 million
TE	Derek Carrier	27	Los Angeles Rams	3 years, $5.55 million
FB	Keith Smith	25	Dallas Cowboys	2 years, $3 million
S	Marcus Gilchrist	29	Houston Texans	1 year, $4 million
LB	Tahir Whitehead	27	Detroit Lions	3 years, $19 million
DT	Justin Ellis	27	Oakland Raiders	3 years, $15 million
TE	Lee Smith	30	Oakland Raiders	3 years, $9 million
LS	Andrew DePaola	30	Chicago Bears	4 years, $4.27 million
QB	Josh Johnson	31	Houston Texans	1 year, $1.005 million
CB	Shareece Wright	30	Buffalo Bills	1 year, $1.005 million
S	Reggie Nelson	34	Oakland Raiders	1 year, $2.5 million
WR	Dwayne Harris	30	New York Giants	1 year, $880,000
DE	Armonty Bryant	27	Detroit Lions	1 year, $790,000
CB	Senquez Golson	24	Tampa Bay Buccaneers	1 year, $555,000
LB	Shilique Calhoun	26	Oakland Raiders	1 year, $555,000
LB/DE	James Cowser	27	Oakland Raiders	1 year, $630,000
S	Erik Harris	28	Oakland Raiders	1 year, $555,000
G/T	Denver Kirkland	24	Oakland Raiders	1 year, $630,000
K	Giorgio Tavecchio	27	Oakland Raiders	1 year, $555,000
CB	Daryl Worley	23	Carolina Panthers (traded to Philadelphia before being released)	1 year, $630,000
LB	Derrick Johnson	35	Kansas City Chiefs	1 year, $3 million
S	Dallin Leavitt	24	N/A (college)	3 years, $1.71 million
LS	Drew Scott	23	N/A (college)	3 years, $1.71 million
G	Cameron Hunt	26	Denver Broncos	2 years, $1.05 million
DT	Ahtyba Rubin	32	Atlanta Falcons	1 year, $1.015 million
DT	Frostee Rucker	34	Arizona Cardinals	1 year, $1.015 million
FB	Ryan Yurachek	22	N/A (college)	3 years, $1.71 million

=== Losses ===
Position	Player	Age	2018 team
WR	Michael Crabtree	30	Baltimore Ravens
OL	Marshall Newhouse	29	Buffalo Bills
CB	Sean Smith	30	Free agent
CB	T. J. Carrie	27	Cleveland Browns
DE	Denico Autry	27	Indianapolis Colts
LB	Aldon Smith	28	Free agent
CB	David Amerson	26	Kansas City Chiefs
K	Sebastian Janikowski	39	Seattle Seahawks
P	Marquette King	29	Denver Broncos
TE	Clive Walford	26	New York Jets
LS	Andrew East	26	Memphis Express (AAF), Washington Redskins
DT	Darius Latham	23	Free agent
DE	Armonty Bryant	27	Retirement
LB	Cory James	24	Free agent
QB	Josh Johnson	31	San Diego Fleet, Washington Redskins
P	Colby Wadman	23	Denver Broncos
C	Alex Officer	22	Kansas City Chiefs
QB	Christian Hackenberg	23	Cincinnati Bengals, Memphis Express
LB	Brady Sheldon	25	Cleveland Browns, Green Bay Packers
FB	Henry Poggi	24	New England Patriots

=== Trades ===
Player/picks received	Player/compensation sent	Team
5th round pick (2018 draft) (originally owned by KC) (Traded to the Indianapolis Colts during the NFL draft) (WR Daurice Fountain)	WR Cordarrelle Patterson; 6th round pick (2018 draft) (Braxton Berrios)	New England Patriots
5th round pick (2018 draft) (P Johnny Townsend)	FB Jamize Olawale; 6th round pick (2018 draft) (Jamil Demby)	Dallas Cowboys
WR Martavis Bryant	3rd round pick (2018 draft) (Rasheem Green)	Pittsburgh Steelers
WR Ryan Switzer	DE Jihad Ward	Dallas Cowboys
QB Christian Hackenberg	conditional 7th round pick (2019 draft)	New York Jets
1st round pick (2019 draft) (RB Josh Jacobs) 1st round pick (2020 draft) (CB Damon Arnette) 3rd round pick (2020 draft) (WR Bryan Edwards) 6th round pick (2019 draft) (Traded to the New York Jets in the 2019 offseason)	DE/OLB Khalil Mack 2nd round pick (2020 draft) (Cole Kmet) conditional 7th round pick (2020 draft)	Chicago Bears
1st round pick (2019 draft) (S Johnathan Abram)	WR Amari Cooper	Dallas Cowboys

=== Draft ===
2018 Oakland Raiders Draft
Round	Selection	Player	Position	College	Notes
1	15	Kolton Miller	OT	UCLA	From Arizona
2	57	P. J. Hall	DT	Sam Houston State	From Tennessee
3	65	Brandon Parker	OT	NC A&T	From Baltimore
3	87	Arden Key	DE	LSU	From LA Rams
4	110	Nick Nelson	CB	Wisconsin	
5	140	Maurice Hurst	DT	Michigan	From Indianapolis
5	173	Johnny Townsend	P	Florida	From Dallas
6	216	Azeem Victor	LB	Washington	Compensatory pick
7	228	Marcell Ateman	WR	Oklahoma St.	

==== Notes ====
- The Raiders finished with the same overall record and strength of schedule as the San Francisco 49ers at the end of the 2017 season, and their selecting order was determined by way of a coin flip at the NFL Scouting Combine in March 2018; the Raiders lost the coin toss and received the 10th selection. Both teams rotated with the Miami Dolphins, receiving the 9th, 10th and 11th pick in each round.

==== Draft trades ====
- The Raiders traded their fifth-round selection (146th overall, S Tre Flowers) to Seattle in exchange for Seattle's sixth-round selection (192nd overall, T Jamil Demby) and running back Marshawn Lynch.
- The Raiders traded a sixth-round selection (210th overall, WR Braxton Berrios) and wide receiver Cordarrelle Patterson to New England in exchange for Kansas City's fifth-round selection (159th overall, WR Daurice Fountain).
- The Raiders traded a sixth-round selection (192nd overall, T Jamil Demby) and fullback Jamize Olawale to Dallas in exchange for Dallas's fifth-round selection (173rd overall, P Johnny Townsend).
- The Raiders were awarded four sixth-round compensatory picks (210th, 212th, 216th and 217th overall).

==== Undrafted free agent signings ====
- Marcus Baugh, TE, Ohio State, released at the end of training camp.
- Saeed Blacknall, WR, Penn State, waived and made the practice squad.
- Jason Cabinda, LB, Penn State, released at the end of training camp.
- Alex Officer, C, Pittsburgh, released on May 17.
- Eddy Piñeiro, K, Florida, placed on injured reserve at the end of training camp.
- Nick Sharga, FB, Temple, released on May 7.

== Staff ==
2018 Oakland Raiders staff
Front office: Owner – Mark Davis; President – Marc Badain; Executive vice president/general counsel – Dan Ventrelle; Interim general manager/director of college scouting – Shaun Herock; Director of football administration – Tom Delaney; Director of player personnel – Joey Clinkscales; Assistant director of player personnel – Trey Scott; Director of pro personnel – Dane Vandernat; Assistant director of pro personnel – Von Hutchins; Assistant director of college scouting – Brad Kaplan; Head coaches: Head coach – Jon Gruden; Assistant head coach/special teams coordinator – Rich Bisaccia; Offensive coaches: Offensive coordinator – Greg Olson; Quarterbacks – Brian Callahan; Running backs – Jemal Singleton; Wide receivers – Edgar Bennett; Tight ends – Frank Smith; Offensive line – Tom Cable; Assistant offensive line – Lemuel Jeanpierre; Offensive quality control – Nick Holz; Offensive quality control – Tim Berbenich	Defensive coaches: Defensive coordinator – Paul Guenther; Defensive line – Mike Trgovac; Assistant defensive line – Marco Coleman; Linebackers – David Lippincott; Defensive backs – Derrick Ansley; Senior defensive assistant – Jim O'Neil; Defensive quality control – Travis Smith; Special teams coaches: Assistant special teams – Byron Storer; Strength and conditioning: Head strength and conditioning – Vacant; Strength and conditioning assistant – D'Anthony Batiste; Strength and conditioning assistant – Deuce Gruden; Strength and conditioning assistant – Kelsey Martinez; Strength and conditioning assistant – Rick Slate

== Final roster ==
2018 Oakland Raiders roster
Quarterbacks (QB): 4 Derek Carr; 2 A. J. McCarron; Running backs (RB): 28 Doug Martin; 30 Jalen Richard; 41 Keith Smith FB; 33 DeAndré Washington; Wide receivers (WR): 88 Marcell Ateman; 17 Dwayne Harris; 14 Keon Hatcher; 82 Jordy Nelson; 10 Seth Roberts; Tight ends (TE): 84 Paul Butler; 85 Derek Carrier; 87 Jared Cook; 86 Lee Smith; 83 Darren Waller	Offensive linemen (OL): 69 Denzelle Good G; 65 Chaz Green G; 61 Rodney Hudson C; 63 Cameron Hunt G; 79 Denver Kirkland G; 77 Kolton Miller LT; 71 Justin Murray LT; 70 Kelechi Osemele G; 75 Brandon Parker RT; 68 David Sharpe T; Defensive linemen (DL): 96 Kony Ealy DE; 78 Justin Ellis DT; 92 P. J. Hall DT; 90 Johnathan Hankins DT; 73 Maurice Hurst II DT; 99 Arden Key DE; 97 Clinton McDonald DT; 98 Frostee Rucker DE; 57 Gabe Wright DT	Linebackers (LB): 53 Jason Cabinda MLB; 55 Marquel Lee MLB; 50 Nicholas Morrow OLB; 59 Tahir Whitehead OLB; 58 Kyle Wilber OLB; Defensive backs (DB): 37 Bené Benwikere CB; 21 Gareon Conley CB; 38 Rico Gafford CB; 31 Marcus Gilchrist SS; 25 Erik Harris SS; 42 Karl Joseph FS; 32 Dallin Leavitt FS; 36 Montrel Meander CB; 22 Rashaan Melvin CB; 23 Nick Nelson CB; Special teams (ST): 8 Daniel Carlson K; 5 Johnny Townsend P; 47 Trent Sieg LS	Practice squad: 80 Saeed Blacknall WR; 40 James Butler RB; 46 Cayson Collins MLB; 49 James Cowser OLB; 18 Rashard Davis WR; 35 Makinton Dorleant CB; 16 Johnny Holton WR; 64 Jamar McGloster RT; 3 Nathan Peterman QB; 44 Ryan Yurachek FB; Reserve: 12 Martavis Bryant WR (Susp.); 91 Shilique Calhoun DE (IR); 74 T. J. Clemmings RT (IR); 48 Andrew DePaola LS (IR); 76 Jon Feliciano G (IR); 29 Leon Hall CB (IR); 66 Gabe Jackson G (IR); 19 Brandon LaFell WR (IR); 24 Marshawn Lynch RB (IR); 23 Dexter McDonald CB (IR); 37 Tevin Mitchel CB (IR); 27 Reggie Nelson FS (IR); 6 Mike Nugent K (IR); 72 Donald Penn LT (IR/DFR); 9 Eddy Piñeiro K (IR); 93 Ahtyba Rubin DT (IR); 93 Jacquies Smith DE (IR); 94 Eddie Vanderdoes DT (PUP); 34 Chris Warren III RB (IR); 20 Daryl Worley CB (IR); Rookies in italics 53 active, 20 reserve, 10 practice squad

== Preseason ==
The Raiders' preseason opponents and schedule were released on April 11.

=== Schedule ===
Week	Date	Opponent	Result	Record	Venue	Recap
1	August 10	Detroit Lions	W 16–10	1–0	Oakland–Alameda County Coliseum	Recap
2	August 18	at Los Angeles Rams	L 15–19	1–1	Los Angeles Memorial Coliseum	Recap
3	August 24	Green Bay Packers	W 13–6	2–1	Oakland–Alameda County Coliseum	Recap
4	August 30	at Seattle Seahawks	W 30–19	3–1	CenturyLink Field	Recap

== Regular season ==
On January 11, the NFL announced that the Raiders will play host to the Seattle Seahawks in a London Game in London, England. The game site, originally slated for Tottenham Hotspur Stadium, was later moved to Wembley Stadium. This marked the fourth time in five seasons in which the Raiders played a game outside the United States, as well as their second visit to London (the other being 2014).

=== Schedule ===
Week	Date	Opponent	Result	Record	Venue	Recap
1	September 10	Los Angeles Rams	**L** 13–33	0–1	Oakland–Alameda County Coliseum	Recap
2	September 16	at **Denver Broncos**	**L** 19–20	0–2	Broncos Stadium at Mile High	Recap
3	September 23	at Miami Dolphins	**L** 20–28	0–3	Hard Rock Stadium	Recap
4	September 30	Cleveland Browns	**W** 45–42 (OT)	1–3	Oakland–Alameda County Coliseum	Recap
5	October 7	at **Los Angeles Chargers**	**L** 10–26	1–4	StubHub Center	Recap
6	October 14	Seattle Seahawks	**L** 3–27	1–5	(United Kingdom) Wembley Stadium (London)	Recap
7	Bye					
8	October 28	Indianapolis Colts	**L** 28–42	1–6	Oakland–Alameda County Coliseum	Recap
9	November 1	at San Francisco 49ers	**L** 3–34	1–7	Levi's Stadium	Recap
10	November 11	**Los Angeles Chargers**	**L** 6–20	1–8	Oakland–Alameda County Coliseum	Recap
11	November 18	at Arizona Cardinals	**W** 23–21	2–8	State Farm Stadium	Recap
12	November 25	at Baltimore Ravens	**L** 17–34	2–9	M&T Bank Stadium	Recap
13	December 2	**Kansas City Chiefs**	**L** 33–40	2–10	Oakland–Alameda County Coliseum	Recap
14	December 9	Pittsburgh Steelers	**W** 24–21	3–10	Oakland–Alameda County Coliseum	Recap
15	December 16	at Cincinnati Bengals	**L** 16–30	3–11	Paul Brown Stadium	Recap
16	December 24	**Denver Broncos**	**W** 27–14	4–11	Oakland–Alameda County Coliseum	Recap
17	December 30	at **Kansas City Chiefs**	**L** 3–35	4–12	Arrowhead Stadium	Recap

Note: Intra-division opponents are in bold text

=== Game summaries ===
==== Week 1: vs. Los Angeles Rams ====
Week One: Los Angeles Rams at Oakland Raiders – Game summary

Quarter	1	2	3	4	Total
**Rams**	7	3	10	13	**33**
Raiders	7	6	0	0	**13**

at Oakland–Alameda County Coliseum, Oakland, California

- Date: September 10
- Game time: 7:20 p.m. PDT
- Game weather: 69 °F (21 °C), Clear
- Game attendance: 53,857
- Referee: Ronald Torbert
- TV announcers (ESPN/KGO): Joe Tessitore, Jason Witten, Booger McFarland and Lisa Salters
- Recap, Gamebook

Game information

**First quarter**

- OAK – Marshawn Lynch 10-yard run (Mike Nugent kick), 10:32. Raiders 7–0. **Drive: 7 plays, 75 yards, 4:37.**
- LAR – Todd Gurley 19-yard pass from Jared Goff (Greg Zuerlein kick), 4:59. Tied 7–7. **Drive: 4 plays, 50 yards, 1:14.**

**Second quarter**

- OAK – Mike Nugent 24-yard field goal, 12:33. Raiders 10–7. **Drive: 12 plays, 69 yards, 7:22.**
- LAR – Greg Zuerlein 20-yard field goal, 2:43. Tied 10–10. **Drive: 7 plays, 78 yards, 2:11.**
- OAK – Mike Nugent 48-yard field goal, 0:15. Raiders 13–10. **Drive: 11 plays, 45 yards, 2:30.**

**Third quarter**

- LAR – Greg Zuerlein 28-yard field goal, 9:07. Tied 13–13. **Drive: 10 plays, 60 yards, 5:56.**
- LAR – Cooper Kupp 8-yard pass from Jared Goff (Greg Zuerlein kick), 0:03. Rams 20–13. **Drive: 4 plays, 58 yards, 1:42.**

**Fourth quarter**

- LAR – Greg Zuerlein 55-yard field goal, 9:24. Rams 23–13. **Drive: 11 plays, 51 yards, 4:15.**
- LAR – Greg Zuerlein 20-yard field goal, 3:18. Rams 26–13. **Drive: 13 plays, 69 yards, 4:43.**
- LAR – Marcus Peters 50-yard interception return (Greg Zuerlein kick), 2:11. Rams 33–13.

**Top passers**

- LAR – Jared Goff – 18/33, 233 yards, 2 TD
- OAK – Derek Carr – 29/40, 303 yards, 3 INT

**Top rushers**

- LAR – Todd Gurley – 20 rushes, 108 yards
- OAK – Marshawn Lynch – 11 rushes, 41 yards, TD

**Top receivers**

- LAR – Brandin Cooks – 5 receptions, 87 yards
- OAK – Jared Cook – 9 receptions, 180 yards

During the game, tight end Jared Cook set a new franchise record for most receiving yards in a game by a Raiders tight end finishing the night with 180 yards on nine catches. The previous record was held by Todd Christensen with 173 yards on November 20, 1986 against the San Diego Chargers. He was one of only six tight ends to ever record over 180 yards receiving since 1999. Quarterback Derek Carr threw three interceptions in a game for his second time in his career, the previous time was against the Kansas City Chiefs in 2015.

==== Week 2: at Denver Broncos ====
Week Two: Oakland Raiders at Denver Broncos – Game summary

Quarter	1	2	3	4	Total
Raiders	3	9	7	0	**19**
**Broncos**	0	0	10	10	**20**

at Broncos Stadium at Mile High, Denver, Colorado

- Date: September 16
- Game time: 2:25 p.m. MDT/1:25 p.m. PDT
- Game weather: 92 °F (33 °C), sunny
- Game attendance: 76,696
- Referee: John Hussey
- TV announcers (CBS): Greg Gumbel, Trent Green, Bruce Arians and Melanie Collins
- Recap, Gamebook

Game information

**First quarter**

- OAK – Mike Nugent 26-yard field goal, 9:33. Raiders 3–0. **Drive: 9 plays, 67 yards, 5:27.**

**Second quarter**

- OAK – Mike Nugent 46-yard field goal, 11:47. Raiders 6–0. **Drive: 9 plays, 43 yards, 4:54.**
- OAK – Marshawn Lynch 1-yard run (kick blocked), 0:35. Raiders 12–0. **Drive: 10 plays, 75 yards, 4:51.**

**Third quarter**

- DEN – Royce Freeman 1-yard run (Brandon McManus kick), 9:06. Raiders 12–7. **Drive: 11 plays, 75 yards, 5:54.**
- OAK – Seth Roberts 20-yard pass from Derek Carr (Mike Nugent kick), 5:25. Raiders 19–7. **Drive: 6 plays, 75 yards, 3:41.**
- DEN – Brandon McManus 39-yard field goal, 2:43. Raiders 19–10. **Drive: 10 plays, 54 yards, 2:42.**

**Fourth quarter**

- DEN – Case Keenum 1-yard run (Brandon McManus kick), 5:58. Raiders 19–17. **Drive: 14 plays, 67 yards, 7:08.**
- DEN – Brandon McManus 36-yard field goal, 0:06. Broncos 20–19. **Drive: 10 plays, 62 yards, 1:52.**

**Top passers**

- OAK – Derek Carr – 29/32, 288 yards, TD
- DEN – Case Keenum – 19/35, 222 yards, INT (1 rushing TD)

**Top rushers**

- OAK – Marshawn Lynch – 18 carries, 65 yards, TD
- DEN – Philip Lindsay – 14 carries, 107 yards

**Top receivers**

- OAK – Amari Cooper – 10 receptions, 116 yards
- DEN – Emmanuel Sanders – 4 receptions, 96 yards

==== Week 3: at Miami Dolphins ====
Week Three: Oakland Raiders at Miami Dolphins – Game summary

Quarter	1	2	3	4	Total
Raiders	7	3	7	3	**20**
**Dolphins**	0	7	7	14	**28**

at Hard Rock Stadium, Miami Gardens, Florida

- Date: September 23
- Game time: 1:00 p.m. EDT/10:00 a.m. PDT
- Game weather: 90 °F (32 °C), partly cloudy
- Game attendance: 65,667
- Referee: Shawn Hochuli
- TV announcers (CBS): Greg Gumbel, Trent Green, Bruce Arians and Melanie Collins
- Recap, Gamebook

Game information

**First quarter**

- OAK – Jordy Nelson 12-yard pass from Derek Carr (Mike Nugent kick), 13:34. Raiders 7–0. **Drive: 4 plays, 75 yards, 1:26.**

**Second quarter**

- MIA – Kenny Stills 34-yard pass from Ryan Tannehill (Jason Sanders kick), 12:11. Tied 7–7. **Drive: 3 plays, 35 yards, 1:31.**
- OAK – Mike Nugent 25-yard field goal, 3:34. Raiders 10–7. **Drive: 16 plays, 68 yards, 8:37.**

**Third quarter**

- OAK – Marshawn Lynch 1-yard run (Mike Nugent kick), 2:58. Raiders 17–7. **Drive: 15 plays, 67 yards, 9:44.**
- MIA – Jakeem Grant 18-yard pass from Ryan Tannehill (Jason Sanders kick), 0:55. Raiders 17–14. **Drive: 4 plays, 70 yards, 2:03.**

**Fourth quarter**

- MIA – Jakeem Grant 52-yard pass from Albert Wilson (Jason Sanders kick), 7:18. Dolphins 21–17. **Drive: 2 plays, 70 yards, 0:48.**
- MIA – Albert Wilson 74-yard pass from Ryan Tannehill (Jason Sanders kick), 2:00. Dolphins 28–17. **Drive: 2 plays, 80 yards, 0:54.**
- OAK – Mike Nugent 52-yard field goal, 0:20. Dolphins 28–20. **Drive: 6 plays, 41 yards, 1:40.**

**Top passers**

- OAK – Derek Carr – 27/39, 345 yards, 1 TD, 2 INT
- MIA – Ryan Tannehill – 17/23, 289 yards, 3 TD

**Top rushers**

- OAK – Marshawn Lynch – 19 carries, 64 yards, 1 TD
- MIA – Ryan Tannehill – 3 carries, 26 yards

**Top receivers**

- OAK – Jordy Nelson – 6 receptions, 173 yards, 1 TD
- MIA – Kenny Stills – 3 receptions, 61 yards, 1 TD

==== Week 4: vs. Cleveland Browns ====
Week Four: Cleveland Browns at Oakland Raiders – Game summary

Quarter	1	2	3	4	OT	Total
Browns	3	14	11	14	0	**42**
**Raiders**	7	7	7	21	3	**45**

at Oakland–Alameda County Coliseum, Oakland, California

- Date: September 30
- Game time: 1:05 p.m. PDT
- Game weather: 71 °F (22 °C), partly cloudy
- Game attendance: 53,387
- Referee: Walt Anderson
- TV announcers (Fox): Kenny Albert, Ronde Barber and Megan Olivi
- Recap, Gamebook

Game information

**First quarter**

- OAK – Gareon Conley 36-yard interception return (Matt McCrane kick), 10:01. Raiders 7–0.
- CLE – Greg Joseph 25-yard field goal, 2:00. Raiders 7–3. **Drive: 15 plays, 68 yards, 8:01.**

**Second quarter**

- CLE – Nick Chubb 63-yard run (run failed), 12:35. Browns 9–7. **Drive: 1 play, 63 yards, 0:11.**
- CLE – Darren Fells 49-yard pass from Baker Mayfield (Duke Johnson run), 9:00. Browns 17–7. **Drive: 4 plays, 70 yards, 1:58.**
- OAK – Amari Cooper 8-yard pass from Derek Carr (Matt McCrane kick), 4:30. Browns 17–14. **Drive: 8 plays, 75 yards, 4:30.**

**Third quarter**

- CLE – Greg Joseph 28-yard field goal, 9:22. Browns 20–14. **Drive: 11 plays, 65 yards, 5:38.**
- CLE – Jarvis Landry 2-yard pass from Baker Mayfield (Duke Johnson run), 7:26. Browns 28–14. **Drive: 2 plays, 31 yards, 0:51.**
- OAK – Jared Cook 7-yard pass from Derek Carr (Matt McCrane kick), 5:34. Browns 28–21. **Drive: 3 plays, 7 yards, 0:11.**

**Fourth quarter**

- OAK – Matt McCrane 29-yard field goal, 14:17. Browns 28–24. **Drive: 6 plays, 58 yards, 2:07.**
- OAK – Jordy Nelson 19-yard pass from Derek Carr (Matt McCrane kick), 12:46. Raiders 31–28. **Drive: 2 plays, 20 yards, 0:40.**
- OAK – Matt McCrane 44-yard field goal, 10:46. Raiders 34–28. **Drive: 4 plays, 3 yards, 1:26.**
- CLE – Carlos Hyde 1-yard run (Greg Joseph kick), 8:07. Browns 35–34. **Drive: 7 plays, 77 yards, 2:39.**
- CLE – Nick Chubb 41-yard run (Greg Joseph kick), 4:20. Browns 42–34. **Drive: 3 plays, 63 yards, 1:25.**
- OAK – Jared Cook 7-yard pass from Derek Carr (Derek Carr pass to Jordy Nelson), 0:30. Tied 42–42. **Drive: 6 plays, 53 yards, 0:58.**

**Overtime**

- OAK – Matt McCrane 29-yard field goal, 1:46. Raiders 45–42. **Drive: 11 plays, 70 yards, 3:41.**

**Top passers**

- CLE – Baker Mayfield – 21/41, 295 yards, 2 TD, 2 INT
- OAK – Derek Carr – 35/58, 437 yards, 4 TD, 2 INT

**Top rushers**

- CLE – Nick Chubb – 3 carries, 105 yards, TD
- OAK – Marshawn Lynch – 20 carries, 130 yards

**Top receivers**

- CLE – Rashard Higgins – 4 receptions, 61 yards
- OAK – Amari Cooper – 8 receptions, 128 yards, TD

==== Week 5: at Los Angeles Chargers ====
Week Five: Oakland Raiders at Los Angeles Chargers – Game summary

Quarter	1	2	3	4	Total
Raiders	0	3	0	7	**10**
**Chargers**	3	14	3	6	**26**

at Stubhub Center, Carson, California

- Date: October 7
- Game time: 1:05 p.m. PDT
- Game weather: 75 °F (24 °C), sunny
- Game attendance: 25,362
- Referee: Alex Kemp
- TV announcers (CBS): Greg Gumbel, Trent Green, Bruce Arians and Melanie Collins
- Recap, Gamebook

Game information

**First quarter**

- LAC – Caleb Sturgis 49-yard field goal, 11:08. Chargers 3–0. **Drive: 7 plays, 37 yards, 3:52.**

**Second quarter**

- OAK – Matt McCrane 24-yard field goal, 13:23. Tied 3–3. **Drive: 10 plays, 77 yards, 5:06.**
- LAC – Austin Ekeler 44-yard pass from Philip Rivers (Caleb Sturgis kick), 4:04. Chargers 10–3. **Drive: 4 plays, 55 yards, 2:04.**
- LAC – Melvin Gordon 1-yard run (Caleb Sturgis kick), 1:39. Chargers 17–3. **Drive: 6 plays, 48 yards, 2:15.**

**Third quarter**

- LAC – Caleb Sturgis 30-yard field goal, 6:05. Chargers 20–3. **Drive: 11 plays, 62 yards, 6:12.**

**Fourth quarter**

- LAC – Virgil Green 13-yard pass from Philip Rivers (kick failed), 9:42. Chargers 26–3. **Drive: 8 plays, 69 yards, 6:23.**
- OAK – Jordy Nelson 1-yard pass from Derek Carr (Matt McCrane kick), 5:11. Chargers 26–10. **Drive: 9 plays, 74 yards, 4:31.**

**Top passers**

- OAK – Derek Carr – 24/33, 268 yards, 1 TD, 1 INT
- LAC – Philip Rivers – 22/27, 339 yards, 2 TD

**Top rushers**

- OAK – Marshawn Lynch – 9 carries, 31 yards
- LAC – Melvin Gordon – 19 carries, 58 yards, 1 TD

**Top receivers**

- OAK – Jalen Richard – 6 receptions, 53 yards
- LAC – Keenan Allen – 8 receptions, 90 yards

==== Week 6: vs. Seattle Seahawks ====
NFL London Games

Week Six: Seattle Seahawks at Oakland Raiders – Game summary

Quarter	1	2	3	4	Total
**Seahawks**	7	10	3	7	**27**
Raiders	0	0	0	3	**3**

at Wembley Stadium, London, England

- Date: October 14
- Game time: 6:00 p.m. BST/10:00 a.m. PDT
- Game weather: 52 °F (11 °C), cloudy
- Game attendance: 84,922
- Referee: Pete Morelli
- TV announcers (Fox): Chris Myers, Daryl Johnston and Laura Okmin
- Recap, Gamebook

Game information

**First quarter**

- SEA – Jaron Brown 5-yard pass from Russell Wilson (Sebastian Janikowski kick), 7:24. Seahawks 7–0. **Drive: 14 plays, 82 yards, 7:36.**

**Second quarter**

- SEA – David Moore 19-yard pass from Russell Wilson (Sebastian Janikowski kick), 14:10. Seahawks 14–0. **Drive: 3 plays, 24 yards, 1:14.**
- SEA – Sebastian Janikowski 44-yard field goal, 0:00. Seahawks 17–0. **Drive: 5 plays, 33 yards, 0:39.**

**Third quarter**

- SEA – Sebastian Janikowski 26-yard field goal, 11:42. Seahawks 20–0. **Drive: 4 plays, 3 yards, 1:56.**

**Fourth quarter**

- SEA – Tyler Lockett 10-yard pass from Russell Wilson (Sebastian Janikowski kick), 14:55. Seahawks 27–0. **Drive: 8 plays, 62 yards, 3:36.**
- OAK – Matt McCrane 43-yard field goal, 8:25. Seahawks 27–3. **Drive: 12 plays, 51 yards, 6:30.**

**Top passers**

- SEA – Russell Wilson – 17/23, 222 yards, 3 TD, 1 INT
- OAK – Derek Carr – 23/31, 142 yards

**Top rushers**

- SEA – Chris Carson – 14 carries, 59 yards
- OAK – Marshawn Lynch – 13 carries, 45 yards

**Top receivers**

- SEA – Doug Baldwin – 6 receptions, 91 yards
- OAK – Jalen Richard – 7 receptions, 48 yards

==== Week 8: vs. Indianapolis Colts ====
Week Eight: Indianapolis Colts at Oakland Raiders – Game summary

Quarter	1	2	3	4	Total
**Colts**	10	3	8	21	**42**
Raiders	0	14	14	0	**28**

at Oakland–Alameda County Coliseum, Oakland, California

- Date: October 28
- Game time: 1:05 p.m. PDT
- Game weather: 69 °F (21 °C), sunny
- Game attendance: 54,372
- Referee: John Parry
- TV announcers (CBS): Andrew Catalon, James Lofton and Amanda Balionis
- Recap, Gamebook

Game information

**First quarter**

- IND – Mo Alie-Cox 26-yard pass from Andrew Luck (Adam Vinatieri kick), 8:21. Colts 7–0. **Drive: 11 plays, 75 yards, 6:39.**
- IND – Adam Vinatieri 26-yard field goal, 0:00. Colts 10–0. **Drive: 13 plays, 70 yards, 7:17.**

**Second quarter**

- OAK – Seth Roberts 31-yard pass from Derek Carr (Daniel Carlson kick), 11:56. Colts 10–7. **Drive: 6 plays, 75 yards, 3:04.**
- OAK – Jared Cook 25-yard pass from Derek Carr (Daniel Carlson kick), 6:13. Raiders 14–10. **Drive: 7 plays, 79 yards, 4:28.**
- IND – Adam Vinatieri 25-yard field goal, 0:26. Raiders 14–13. **Drive: 16 plays, 68 yards, 5:47.**

**Third quarter**

- OAK – Derek Carr 1-yard run (Daniel Carlson kick), 9:49. Raiders 21–13. **Drive: 8 plays, 75 yards, 5:11.**
- IND – Eric Ebron 20-yard pass from Andrew Luck (Andrew Luck-Chester Rogers pass), 7:39. Tied 21–21. **Drive: 4 plays, 75 yards, 2:10.**
- OAK – Brandon LaFell 6-yard pass from Derek Carr (Daniel Carlson kick), 1:01. Raiders 28–21. **Drive: 11 plays, 75 yards, 6:38.**

**Fourth quarter**

- IND – Marlon Mack 4-yard run (Adam Vinatieri kick), 10:47. Tied 28–28. **Drive: 12 plays, 75 yards, 5:14.**
- IND – Jack Doyle 10-yard pass from Andrew Luck (Adam Vinatieri kick), 5:28. Colts 35–28. **Drive: 6 plays, 57 yards, 3:52.**
- IND – Marlon Mack 1-yard run (Adam Vinatieri kick), 2:55. Colts 42–28. **Drive: 5 plays, 27 yards, 2:21.**

**Top passers**

- IND – Andrew Luck – 22/31, 239 yards, 3 TD
- OAK – Derek Carr – 21/28, 244 yards, 3 TD

**Top rushers**

- IND – Marlon Mack – 25 carries, 132 yards, 2 TD
- OAK – Doug Martin – 13 carries, 72 yards

**Top receivers**

- IND – Jack Doyle – 6 receptions, 70 yards, 1 TD
- OAK – Jared Cook – 4 receptions, 74 yards, 1 TD

This game was the first game for the Raiders without wide receiver Amari Cooper, as the Dallas Cowboys traded their 2019 1st round draft pick in exchange for Cooper the week before the game.

==== Week 9: at San Francisco 49ers ====
Week Nine: Oakland Raiders at San Francisco 49ers – Game summary

Quarter	1	2	3	4	Total
Raiders	3	0	0	0	**3**
**49ers**	7	10	14	3	**34**

at Levi's Stadium, Santa Clara, California

- Date: November 1
- Game time: 5:20 p.m. PDT
- Game weather: 82 °F (28 °C), clear
- Game attendance: 69,592
- Referee: Carl Cheffers
- TV announcers (Fox/NFLN): Joe Buck, Troy Aikman, Erin Andrews and Kristina Pink
- Recap, Gamebook

Game information

**First quarter**

- OAK – Daniel Carlson 37-yard field goal, 9:30. Raiders 3–0. **Drive: 10 plays, 56 yards, 5:30.**
- SF – Pierre Garçon 24-yard pass from Nick Mullens (Robbie Gould kick), 6:47. 49ers 7–3. **Drive: 6 plays, 75 yards, 2:43.**

**Second quarter**

- SF – Kendrick Bourne 4-yard pass from Nick Mullens (Robbie Gould kick), 12:40. 49ers 14–3. **Drive: 13 plays, 66 yards, 7:24.**
- SF – Robbie Gould 39-yard field goal, 0:16. 49ers 17–3. **Drive: 7 plays, 59 yards, 1:38.**

**Third quarter**

- SF – George Kittle 5-yard pass from Nick Mullens (Robbie Gould kick), 12:36. 49ers 24–3. **Drive: 4 plays, 75 yards, 2:24.**
- SF – Raheem Mostert 52-yard run (Robbie Gould kick), 9:17. 49ers 31–3. **Drive: 3 plays, 68 yards, 1:16.**

**Fourth quarter**

- SF – Robbie Gould 25-yard field goal, 3:59. 49ers 34–3. **Drive: 8 plays, 22 yards, 5:32.**

**Top passers**

- OAK – Derek Carr – 16/21, 171 yards
- SF – Nick Mullens – 16/22, 262 yards, 3 TD

**Top rushers**

- OAK – Doug Martin – 11 carries, 49 yards
- SF – Raheem Mostert – 7 carries, 86 yards, TD

**Top receivers**

- OAK – Jalen Richard – 4 receptions, 45 yards
- SF – George Kittle – 4 receptions, 108 yards, TD

==== Week 10: vs. Los Angeles Chargers ====
Week Ten: Los Angeles Chargers at Oakland Raiders – Game summary

Quarter	1	2	3	4	Total
**Chargers**	0	10	7	3	**20**
Raiders	3	0	0	3	**6**

at Oakland–Alameda County Coliseum, Oakland, California

- Date: November 11
- Game time: 1:05 p.m. PST
- Game weather: 69 °F (21 °C), hazy
- Game attendance: 54,750
- Referee: Craig Wrolstad
- TV announcers (Fox): Dick Stockton, Mark Schlereth, and Jennifer Hale
- Recap, Gamebook

Game information

**First quarter**

- OAK – Daniel Carlson 46-yard field goal, 2:51. Raiders 3–0. **Drive: 8 plays, 32 yards, 3:34.**

**Second quarter**

- LAC – Michael Badgley 27-yard field goal, 5:47. Tied 3–3. **Drive: 11 plays, 31 yards, 5:23.**
- LAC – Keenan Allen 11-yard pass from Philip Rivers (Michael Badgley kick), 0:24. Chargers 10–3. **Drive: 8 plays, 91 yards, 3:09.**

**Third quarter**

- LAC – Melvin Gordon 66-yard pass from Philip Rivers (Michael Badgley kick), 12:32. Chargers 17–3. **Drive: 4 plays, 77 yards, 2:28.**

**Fourth quarter**

- OAK – Daniel Carlson 30-yard field goal, 14:49. Chargers 17–6. **Drive: 9 plays, 69 yards, 3:04.**
- LAC – Michael Badgley 41-yard field goal, 7:12. Chargers 20–6. **Drive: 12 plays, 57 yards, 7:37.**

**Top passers**

- LAC – Philip Rivers – 18/16, 223 yards, 2 TD, INT
- OAK – Derek Carr – 24/37, 243 yards

**Top rushers**

- LAC – Melvin Gordon – 18 carries, 93 yards
- OAK – Doug Martin – 15 carries, 61 yards

**Top receivers**

- LAC – Melvn Gordon – 5 receptions, 72 yards
- OAK – Jalen Richard – 5 receptions, 52 yards

==== Week 11: at Arizona Cardinals ====
Week Eleven: Oakland Raiders at Arizona Cardinals – Game summary

Quarter	1	2	3	4	Total
**Raiders**	7	7	6	3	**23**
Cardinals	14	0	0	7	**21**

at State Farm Stadium, Glendale, Arizona

- Date: November 18
- Game time: 2:05 p.m. MST/1:05 p.m. PST
- Game weather: 72 °F (22 °C), sunny — retractable roof open
- Game attendance: 62,435
- Referee: Jerome Boger
- TV announcers (CBS): Spero Dedes and Adam Archuleta
- Recap, Gamebook

Game information

**First quarter**

- OAK – Jared Cook 23-yard pass from Derek Carr (Daniel Carlson kick), 12:36. Raiders 7–0. **Drive: 3 plays, 33 yards, 1:33.**
- ARI – Larry Fitzgerald 18-yard pass from Josh Rosen (Matt McCrane kick), 6:14. Tied 7–7. **Drive: 9 plays, 64 yards, 6:22.**
- ARI – Christian Kirk 59-yard pass from Josh Rosen (Matt McCrane kick), 0:16. Cardinals 14–7. **Drive: 3 plays, 64 yards, 1:40.**

**Second quarter**

- OAK – Brandon LaFell 5-yard pass from Derek Carr (Daniel Carlson kick), 8:20. Tied 14–14. **Drive: 7 plays, 50 yards, 3:37.**

**Third quarter**

- OAK – Daniel Carlson 49-yard field goal, 10:26. Raiders 17–14. **Drive: 7 plays, 44 yards, 4:34.**
- OAK – Daniel Carlson 21-yard field goal, 0:22. Raiders 20–14. **Drive: 12 plays, 63 yards, 7:39.**

**Fourth quarter**

- ARI – Larry Fitzgerald 5-yard pass from Josh Rosen (Matt McCrane kick), 5:02. Cardinals 21–20. **Drive: 6 plays, 80 yards, 2:37.**
- OAK – Daniel Carlson 35-yard field goal, 0:00. Raiders 23–21. **Drive: 9 plays, 63 yards, 1:53.**

**Top passers**

- OAK – Derek Carr – 19/31, 192 yards, 2 TD
- ARI – Josh Rosen – 9/20, 136 yards, 3 TD

**Top rushers**

- OAK – Jalen Richard – 11 carries, 61 yards
- ARI – David Johnson – 25 carries, 137 yards

**Top receivers**

- OAK – Marcell Ateman – 4 receptions, 50 yards
- ARI – Christian Kirk – 3 receptions, 77 yards, TD

==== Week 12: at Baltimore Ravens ====
Week Twelve: Oakland Raiders at Baltimore Ravens – Game summary

Quarter	1	2	3	4	Total
Raiders	7	3	7	0	**17**
**Ravens**	3	10	7	14	**34**

at M&T Bank Stadium, Baltimore, Maryland

- Date: November 25
- Game time: 1:00 p.m. EST/10:00 a.m. PST
- Game weather: 60 °F (16 °C), partly cloudy
- Game attendance: 70,035
- Referee: Clay Martin
- TV announcers (CBS): Andrew Catalon, James Lofton and Amanda Balionis
- Recap, Gamebook

Game information

**First quarter**

- OAK – Doug Martin 1-yard rush (Daniel Carlson kick), 8:45. Raiders 7–0. **Drive: 12 plays, 81 yards, 6:15.**
- BAL – Justin Tucker 47-yard field goal, 4:28. Raiders 7–3. **Drive: 9 plays, 40 yards, 4:17.**

**Second quarter**

- BAL – Cyrus Jones 70-yard punt return (Justin Tucker kick), 12:45. Ravens 10–7.
- BAL – Justin Tucker 28-yard field goal, 7:11. Ravens 13–7. **Drive: 6 plays, 77 yards, 3:05.**
- OAK – Daniel Carlson 42-yard field goal, 2:34. Ravens 13–10. **Drive: 7 plays, 20 yards, 2:57.**

**Third quarter**

- BAL – Lamar Jackson 5-yard rush (Justin Tucker kick), 8:10. Ravens 20–10. **Drive: 13 plays, 57 yards, 6:50.**
- OAK – Jared Cook 16-yard pass from Derek Carr (Daniel Carlson kick), 5:09. Ravens 20–17. **Drive: 6 plays, 75 yards, 3:01.**

**Fourth quarter**

- BAL – Michael Crabtree 8-yard pass from Lamar Jackson (Justin Tucker kick), 11:16. Ravens 27–17. **Drive: 17 plays, 71 yards, 8:53.**
- BAL – Terrell Suggs 43-yard fumble return (Justin Tucker kick), 5:55. Ravens 34–17.

**Top passers**

- OAK – Derek Carr – 16/34, 194 yards, 1 TD
- BAL – Lamar Jackson – 14/25, 178 yards, 1 TD, 2 INT

**Top rushers**

- OAK – Doug Martin – 11 carries, 51 yards, 1 TD
- BAL – Gus Edwards – 23 carries, 118 yards

**Top receivers**

- OAK – Seth Roberts – 2 receptions, 54 yards
- BAL – Mark Andrews – 1 reception, 74 yards

==== Week 13: vs. Kansas City Chiefs ====
Week Thirteen: Kansas City Chiefs at Oakland Raiders – Game summary

Quarter	1	2	3	4	Total
**Chiefs**	10	9	14	7	**40**
Raiders	0	7	9	17	**33**

at Oakland–Alameda County Coliseum, Oakland, California

- Date: December 2
- Game time: 1:05 p.m. PST
- Game weather: 57 °F (14 °C), sunny skies
- Game attendance: 54,255
- Referee: Shawn Smith
- TV announcers (CBS): Ian Eagle, Dan Fouts and Evan Washburn
- Recap, Gamebook

Game information

**First quarter**

- KC – Travis Kelce 3-yard pass from Patrick Mahomes (Harrison Butker kick), 12:11. Chiefs 7–0. **Drive: 2 plays, 65 yards, 0:52.**
- KC – Harrison Butker 29-yard field goal, 7:42. Chiefs 10–0. **Drive: 8 plays, 39 yards, 3:31.**

**Second quarter**

- KC – Harrison Butker 50-yard field goal, 7:02. Chiefs 13–0. **Drive: 12 plays, 38 yards, 6:00.**
- OAK – Doug Martin 1-yard rush (Daniel Carlson kick), 1:04. Chiefs 13–7. **Drive: 11 plays, 75 yards, 5:58.**
- KC – Travis Kelce 6-yard pass from Patrick Mahomes (kick blocked), 0:07. Chiefs 19–7. **Drive: 5 plays, 82 yards, 0:57.**

**Third quarter**

- OAK – Daniel Carlson 50-yard field goal, 11:06. Chiefs 19–10. **Drive: 8 plays, 43 yards, 3:54.**
- KC – Spencer Ware 1-yard rush (Harrison Butker kick), 5:48. Chiefs 26–10. **Drive: 11 plays, 75 yards, 5:18.**
- OAK – Jared Cook 24-yard pass from Derek Carr (run failed), 3:28. Chiefs 26–16. **Drive: 6 plays, 68 yards, 2:20.**
- KC – Demetrius Harris 13-yard pass from Patrick Mahomes (Harrison Butker kick), 0:04. Chiefs 33–16. **Drive: 7 plays, 52 yards, 2:09.**

**Fourth quarter**

- OAK – Lee Smith 1-yard pass from Derek Carr (Daniel Carlson kick), 10:41. Chiefs 33–23. **Drive: 10 plays, 75 yards, 4:23.**
- OAK – Marcell Ateman 9-yard pass from Derek Carr (Daniel Carlson kick), 6:46. Chiefs 33–30. **Drive: 6 plays, 54 yards, 2:32.**
- KC – Chris Conley 2-yard pass from Patrick Mahomes (Harrison Butker kick), 1:54. Chiefs 40–30. **Drive: 10 plays, 75 yards, 4:52.**
- OAK – Daniel Carlson 44-yard field goal, 0:30. Chiefs 40–33. **Drive: 8 plays, 49 yards, 1:24.**

**Top passers**

- KC – Patrick Mahomes – 23/38, 295 yards, 4 TD
- OAK – Derek Carr – 29/38, 285 yards, 3 TD

**Top rushers**

- KC – Patrick Mahomes – 9 carries, 52 yards
- OAK – Jalen Richard – 6 carries, 95 yards

**Top receivers**

- KC – Travis Kelce – 12 receptions, 168 yards, 2 TD
- OAK – Jared Cook – 7 receptions, 100 yards, TD

With the brutal loss the Raiders dropped to 2-10 and they were eliminated from playoff contention.

==== Week 14: vs. Pittsburgh Steelers ====
Week Fourteen: Pittsburgh Steelers at Oakland Raiders – Game summary

Quarter	1	2	3	4	Total
Steelers	0	14	0	7	**21**
**Raiders**	7	3	0	14	**24**

at Oakland–Alameda County Coliseum, Oakland, California

- Date: December 9
- Game time: 1:25 p.m. PST
- Game weather: 55 °F (13 °C), partly cloudy
- Game attendance: 53,960
- Referee: Ronald Torbert
- TV announcers (Fox): Thom Brennaman, Chris Spielman and Shannon Spake
- Recap, Gamebook

Game information

**First quarter**

- OAK – Doug Martin 1-yard rush (Daniel Carlson kick), 10:44. Raiders 7–0. **Drive: 8 plays, 74 yards, 4:16.**

**Second quarter**

- PIT – Stevan Ridley 2-yard rush (Chris Boswell kick), 12:18. Tied 7–7. **Drive: 11 plays, 67 yards, 6:30.**
- OAK – Daniel Carlson 44-yard field goal, 8:04. Raiders 10–7. **Drive: 10 plays, 46 yards, 4:14.**
- PIT – JuJu Smith-Schuster 1-yard pass from Ben Roethlisberger (Chris Boswell kick), 0:10. Steelers 14–10. **Drive: 9 plays, 53 yards, 2:47.**

**Third quarter**

- No scoring plays.

**Fourth quarter**

- OAK – Lee Smith 3-yard pass from Derek Carr (Daniel Carlson kick), 5:20. Raiders 17–14. **Drive: 14 plays, 73 yards, 7:50.**
- PIT – JuJu Smith-Schuster 1-yard pass from Ben Roethlisberger (Chris Boswell kick), 2:55. Steelers 21–17. **Drive: 6 plays, 75 yards, 2:25.**
- OAK – Derek Carrier 6-yard pass from Derek Carr (Daniel Carlson kick), 0:21. Raiders 24–21. **Drive: 8 plays, 75 yards, 2:34.**

**Top passers**

- PIT – Ben Roethlisberger – 25/29, 282 yards, 2 TD
- OAK – Derek Carr – 25/34, 322 yards, 2 TD

**Top rushers**

- PIT – Jaylen Samuels – 11 carries, 28 yards
- OAK – Doug Martin – 16 carries, 32 yards, TD

**Top receivers**

- PIT – JuJu Smith-Schuster – 8 receptions, 130 yards, 2 TD
- OAK – Jared Cook – 7 receptions, 116 yards

==== Week 15: at Cincinnati Bengals ====
Week Fifteen: Oakland Raiders at Cincinnati Bengals – Game summary

Quarter	1	2	3	4	Total
Raiders	0	7	6	3	**16**
**Bengals**	7	13	0	10	**30**

at Paul Brown Stadium, Cincinnati, Ohio

- Date: December 16
- Game time: 1:00 p.m. EST/10:00 a.m. PST
- Game weather: 43 °F (6 °C), overcast
- Game attendance: 44,568
- Referee: Alex Kemp
- TV announcers (CBS): Andrew Catalon and James Lofton
- Recap, Gamebook

Game information

**First quarter**

- CIN – Tyler Boyd 7-yard pass from Jeff Driskel (Randy Bullock kick), 3:00. Bengals 7–0. **Drive: 9 plays, 45 yards, 4:42.**

**Second quarter**

- CIN – Joe Mixon 1-yard run (Randy Bullock kick), 10:17. Bengals 14–0. **Drive: 12 plays, 90 yards, 4:53.**
- CIN – Randy Bullock 34-yard field goal, 6:41. Bengals 17–0. **Drive: 7 plays, 18 yards, 2:48.**
- OAK – Lee Smith 1-yard pass from Derek Carr (Daniel Carlson kick), 3:48. Bengals 17–7. **Drive: 5 plays, 75 yards, 2:53.**
- CIN – Randy Bullock 38-yard field goal. Bengals 20–7. **Drive: 7 plays, 26 yards, 2:09.**

**Third quarter**

- OAK – Daniel Carlson 50-yard field goal, 6:27. Bengals 20–10. **Drive: 10 plays, 57 yards, 5:46.**
- OAK – Daniel Carlson 27-yard field goal, 2:38. Bengals 20–13. **Drive: 6 plays, 46 yards, 2:44.**

**Fourth quarter**

- CIN – Randy Bullock 23-yard field goal, 10:45. Bengals 23–13. **Drive: 14 plays, 71 yards, 6:53.**
- OAK – Daniel Carlson 40-yard field goal, 5:05. Bengals 23–16. **Drive: 6 plays, 31 yards, 2:00.**
- CIN – Joe Mixon 15-yard run (Randy Bullock kick), 4:04. Bengals 30–16. **Drive: 2 plays, 21 yards, 1:01.**

**Top passers**

- OAK – Derek Carr – 21/38, 263 yards, 1 TD
- CIN – Jeff Driskel – 14/33, 130 yards, 1 TD, 1 INT

**Top rushers**

- OAK – Doug Martin – 9 carries, 39 yards
- CIN – Joe Mixon – 27 carries, 129 yards, 2 TD

**Top receivers**

- OAK – Jordy Nelson – 6 receptions, 88 yards
- CIN – Tyler Boyd – 4 receptions, 38 yards, 1 TD

With the loss the Raiders dropped to 3-11 and secured dead last in the AFC West.

==== Week 16: vs. Denver Broncos ====
Week Sixteen: Denver Broncos at Oakland Raiders – Game summary

Quarter	1	2	3	4	Total
Broncos	0	0	7	7	**14**
**Raiders**	7	10	0	10	**27**

at Oakland–Alameda County Coliseum, Oakland, California

- Date: December 24
- Game time: 5:15 p.m. PST
- Game weather: 58 °F (14 °C), rain
- Game attendance: 53,850
- Referee: Carl Cheffers
- TV announcers (ESPN/KGO): Joe Tessitore, Jason Witten, Booger McFarland and Lisa Salters
- Recap, Gamebook

Game information

**First quarter**

- OAK – Dwayne Harris 99-yard punt return (Daniel Carlson kick), 10:10. Raiders 7–0.

**Second quarter**

- OAK – Doug Martin 24-yard run (Daniel Carlson kick), 7:56. Raiders 14–0. **Drive: 9 plays, 89 yards, 5:35.**
- OAK – Daniel Carlson 43-yard field goal, 0:19. Raiders 17–0. **Drive: 11 plays, 55 yards, 4:02.**

**Third quarter**

- DEN – DaeSean Hamilton 7-yard pass from Case Keenum (Brandon McManus kick), 4:36. Raiders 17–7. **Drive: 10 plays, 82 yards, 3:34.**

**Fourth quarter**

- OAK – Jalen Richard 3-yard run (Daniel Carlson kick), 12:16. Raiders 24–7. **Drive: 12 plays, 72 yards, 7:20.**
- DEN – Courtland Sutton 19-yard pass from Case Keenum (Brandon McManus kick), 7:31. Raiders 24–14. **Drive: 11 plays, 77 yards, 4:45.**
- OAK – Daniel Carlson 45-yard field goal, 4:38. Raiders 27–14. **Drive: 4 plays, 4 yards, 0:58.**

**Top passers**

- DEN – Case Keenum – 23/37, 202 yards, 2 TD, 2 INT
- OAK – Derek Carr – 19/26, 167 yards

**Top rushers**

- DEN – Phillip Lindsay – 10 rushes, 46 yards
- OAK – Doug Martin – 21 rushes, 107 yards, TD

**Top receivers**

- DEN – Courtland Sutton – 6 receptions, 65 yards, TD
- OAK – Jordy Nelson – 7 receptions, 75 yards

==== Week 17: at Kansas City Chiefs ====
Week Seventeen: Oakland Raiders at Kansas City Chiefs – Game summary

Quarter	1	2	3	4	Total
Raiders	0	3	0	0	**3**
**Chiefs**	14	7	7	7	**35**

at Arrowhead Stadium, Kansas City, Missouri

- Date: December 30
- Game time: 3:25 p.m. CST/1:25 p.m. PST
- Game weather: 45 °F (7 °C), sunny
- Game attendance: 77,550
- Referee: Shawn Hochuli
- TV announcers (CBS): Greg Gumbel, Trent Green, Bruce Arians and Melanie Collins
- Recap, Gamebook

Game information

**First quarter**

- KC – Tyreek Hill 67-yard pass from Patrick Mahomes (Harrison Butker kick), 12:41. Chiefs 7–0. **Drive: 6 plays, 84 yards, 2:19**.
- KC – Daniel Sorensen 54-yard Interception Return (Harrison Bukter kick), 5:44. Chiefs 14–0.

**Second quarter**

- KC – Damien Williams 4-yard rush (Harrison Butker kick), 9:31. Chiefs 21–0. **Drive: 9 plays, 60 yards, 4:40**.
- OAK – Daniel Carlson 50-yard field goal, 1:09. Chiefs 21-3. **Drive: 13 plays, 66 yards, 4:39**.

**Third quarter**

- KC – Demarcus Robinson 89-yard pass from Patrick Mahomes (Harrison Butker kick), 8:51. Chiefs 28–3. **Drive: 5 plays, 99 yards, 1:34**.

**Fourth quarter**

- KC – Tyreek Hill 15-yard rush (Harrison Butker kick), 13:25. Chiefs 35–3. **Drive: 10 plays, 92 yards, 5:36**.

**Top passers**

- OAK – Derek Carr 24-33, 185 yards, 2 INT
- KC – Patrick Mahomes 14-24, 281 yards, 2 TD, 1 INT

**Top rushers**

- OAK – Doug Martin 21 carries, 100 yards
- KC – Damien Williams 11 carries, 51 yards, 1 TD

**Top receivers**

- OAK – Jordy Nelson 9 receptions, 78 yards
- KC – Tyreek Hill 5 receptions, 101 yards, 1 TD

=== Standings ===
==== Division ====
AFC West
	W	L	T	PCT	DIV	CONF	PF	PA	STK
^{(1)} Kansas City Chiefs	12	4	0	.750	5–1	10–2	565	421	W1
^{(5)} Los Angeles Chargers	12	4	0	.750	4–2	9–3	428	329	W1
Denver Broncos	6	10	0	.375	2–4	4–8	329	349	L4
Oakland Raiders	4	12	0	.250	1–5	3–9	290	467	L1

==== Conference ====
AFC
#	Team	Division	W	L	T	PCT	DIV	CONF	SOS	SOV	STK
**Division leaders**
1 (Note: Kansas City finished ahead of LA Chargers in the AFC West based on division record, claiming the No. 1 seed.)	Kansas City Chiefs	West	12	4	0	.750	5–1	10–2	.480	.401	W1
2 (Note: New England claimed the No. 2 seed over Houston based on head-to-head victory.)	New England Patriots	East	11	5	0	.688	5–1	8–4	.482	.494	W2
3	Houston Texans	South	11	5	0	.688	4–2	9–3	.471	.435	W1
4	Baltimore Ravens	North	10	6	0	.625	3–3	8–4	.496	.450	W3
**Wild Cards**
5	Los Angeles Chargers	West	12	4	0	.750	4–2	9–3	.477	.422	W1
6	Indianapolis Colts	South	10	6	0	.625	4–2	7–5	.465	.456	W4
**Did not qualify for the postseason**
7	Pittsburgh Steelers	North	9	6	1	.594	4–1–1	6–5–1	.504	.448	W1
8	Tennessee Titans	South	9	7	0	.563	3–3	5–7	.520	.465	L1
9	Cleveland Browns	North	7	8	1	.469	3–2–1	5–6–1	.516	.411	L1
10	Miami Dolphins	East	7	9	0	.438	4–2	6–6	.469	.446	L3
11 (Note: Denver finished ahead of Cincinnati and Buffalo based on strength of victory. Cincinnati finished ahead of Buffalo based on record vs. common opponents. Cincinnati's cumulative record against Baltimore, Indianapolis, the Los Angeles Chargers and Miami was 3–2, compared to Buffalo's 1–4 cumulative record against the same four teams.)	Denver Broncos	West	6	10	0	.375	2–4	4–8	.523	.464	L4
12	Cincinnati Bengals	North	6	10	0	.375	1–5	4–8	.535	.448	L2
13	Buffalo Bills	East	6	10	0	.375	2–4	4–8	.523	.411	W1
14	Jacksonville Jaguars	South	5	11	0	.313	1–5	4–8	.549	.463	L1
15 (Note: NY Jets finished ahead of Oakland based on strength of victory.)	New York Jets	East	4	12	0	.250	1–5	3–9	.506	.438	L3
16	Oakland Raiders	West	4	12	0	.250	1–5	3–9	.547	.406	L1
**Tiebreakers** (Note: When breaking ties for three or more teams under the NFL's rules, they are first broken within divisions, then comparing only the highest ranked remaining team from each division.)
