= Herock =

Herock is a surname. Notable people with the surname include:

- Ken Herock (born 1941), American football player
- Shaun Herock, American football executive
