= Justin Ellis (American football) =

American football player (born 1990)

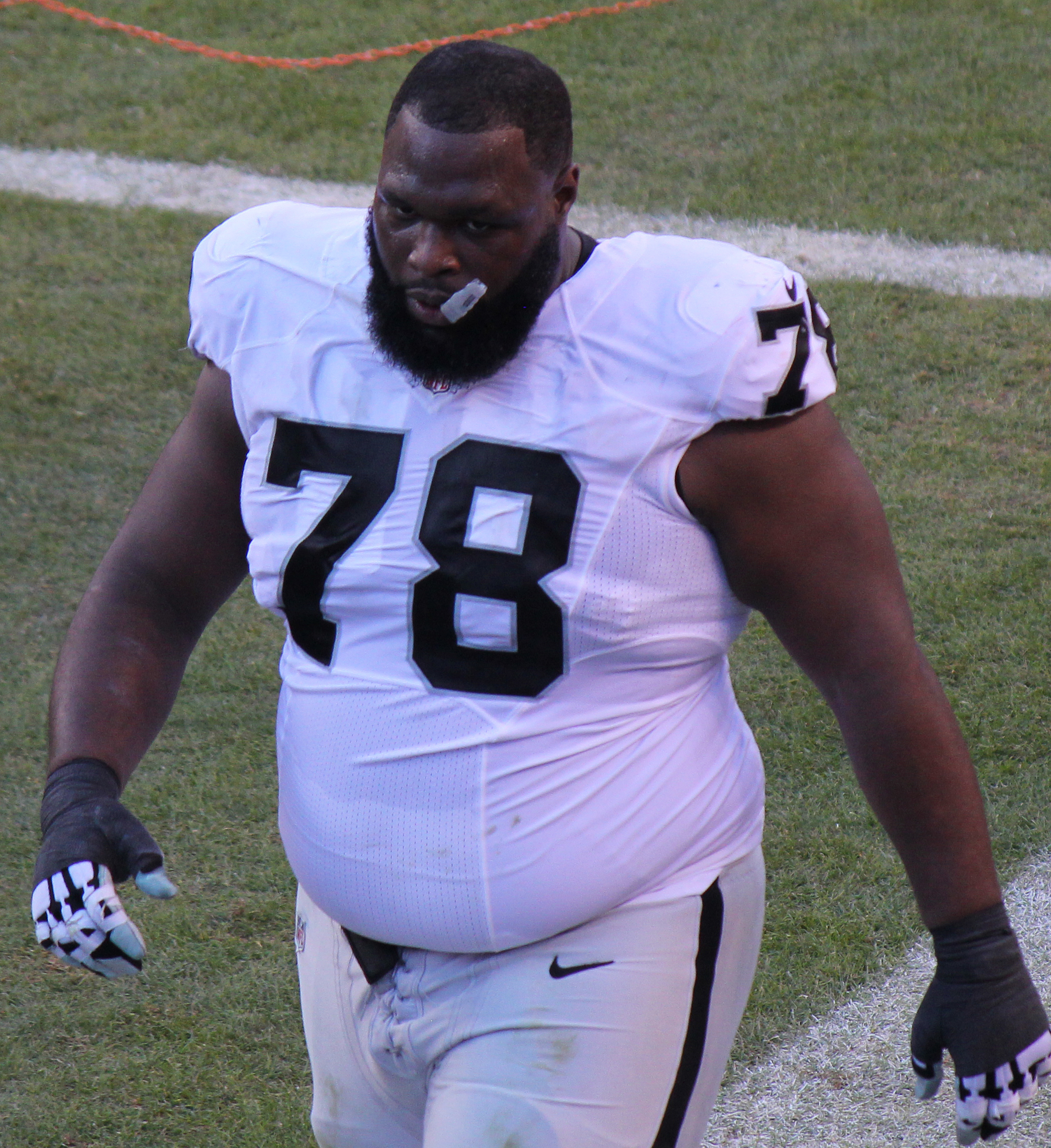
- Ellis with the Oakland Raiders in 2015

No. 78, 71
- Position: Nose tackle

Personal information
- Born: December 27, 1990 (age 35); Monroe, Louisiana, U.S.
- Listed height: 6 ft 2 in (1.88 m)
- Listed weight: 334 lb (151 kg)

Career information
- High school: Neville (Monroe)
- College: Louisiana Tech
- NFL draft: 2014: 4th round, 107th overall pick

Career history
- Oakland Raiders (2014–2019); Baltimore Ravens (2019–2021); New York Giants (2022); Atlanta Falcons (2023)*; Miami Dolphins (2023)*
- * Offseason or practice squad member only

Awards and highlights
- PFWA All-Rookie Team (2014); Second-team All-WAC (2011)

Career NFL statistics
- Total tackles: 182
- Sacks: 1.5
- Pass deflections: 3
- Stats at Pro Football Reference

Justin Jamaal Ellis (born December 27, 1990) is an American former professional football player who was a nose tackle in the National Football League (NFL). He was selected by the Oakland Raiders in the fourth round of the 2014 NFL draft. He played college football for the Louisiana Tech Bulldogs.

== Early life ==
Ellis attended Neville High School in Monroe, Louisiana, where he was a two-time first-team all-District 2-4A selection. He was named first-team all-state by the LSWA as a senior, and was a two-time all-Northeast Louisiana selection by the Monroe News-Star. Ellis also lettered three years in track & field, competing in the shot put, where he finished third in the state as a junior, the javelin throw (top-throw of 47.2 meters) and the discus throw, where he captured the state title with a throw of 47.15 meters in 2009.

He was rated a two-star recruit by Rivals.com.

== College career ==
Ellis attended Louisiana Tech University from 2009 to 2013. He redshirted as a true freshman in 2009. In 2010, Ellis played in four games and recorded three tackles. In 2011, he was a second-team All-Western Athletic Conference (WAC) selection after appearing in all 13 games, recording 20 tackles, 3.5 for loss, one sack and one fumble recovery. In 2012, he recorded 21 total tackles with two forced fumbles. In 2013, he recorded a career high 48 tackles, and set career bests in tackles for loss with 5.5, and sacks with 1.5, earning himself conference honorable mention honors.

== Professional career ==
Pre-draft measurables
Height	Weight	Arm length	Hand span	40-yard dash	10-yard split	20-yard split	20-yard shuttle	Three-cone drill	Vertical jump	Broad jump	Bench press
6 ft 1 1/2 in (1.87 m)	334 lb (151 kg)	33 in (0.84 m)	10 1/8 in (0.26 m)	5.03 s	1.78 s	2.97 s	4.75 s	7.81 s	28.0 in (0.71 m)	7 ft 8 in (2.34 m)	25 reps
All values from NFL Combine, except 40 time from Louisiana Tech's Pro Day

=== Oakland Raiders ===
Ellis was selected by the Oakland Raiders in the fourth round (107th overall) of the 2014 NFL draft. He was named to the PFWA All-Rookie Team.

On March 9, 2018, Ellis signed a three-year $15 million contract extension with the Raiders.

On September 13, 2018, Ellis was placed on injured reserve after suffering a foot injury in Week 1. He was activated off injured reserve on December 1, 2018.

On August 31, 2019, Ellis was placed on injured reserve. He was released on October 8, 2019.

=== Baltimore Ravens ===
On November 12, 2019, Ellis was signed by the Baltimore Ravens.

On March 21, 2020, Ellis re-signed with the Ravens.

On March 5, 2021, Ellis signed a one-year contract extension with the Ravens. He was released on August 31, 2021, and re-signed to the practice squad the next day. He was promoted to the active roster on September 15, 2021.

=== New York Giants ===
On March 23, 2022, the New York Giants signed Ellis to a one-year contract. In Week 13 against the Washington Commanders Ellis recorded his first sack on Taylor Heinicke.

=== Atlanta Falcons ===
On July 28, 2023, Ellis signed with the Atlanta Falcons. He was released on August 26, 2023.

=== Miami Dolphins ===
On December 6, 2023, Ellis was signed to the Miami Dolphins practice squad. He was not signed to a reserve/future contract after the season and thus became a free agent upon the expiration of his practice squad contract.

== NFL career statistics ==
Year	Team	Games		Tackles				Interceptions				Fumbles			
Year	Team	GP	GS	Comb	Solo	Ast	Sck	PD	Int	Yds	TD	FF	FR	Yds	TD
2014	OAK	16	16	21	16	5	0.0	1	0	0	0	0	0	0	0
2015	OAK	12	12	22	17	3	0.0	1	0	0	0	0	0	0	0
2016	OAK	16	16	21	14	6	0.0	0	0	0	0	0	0	0	0
2017	OAK	16	16	48	21	21	0.5	0	0	0	0	0	0	0	0
2018	OAK	6	6	7	2	4	0.0	0	0	0	0	0	0	0	0
2019	BAL	4	4	6	1	4	0.0	0	0	0	0	0	0	0	0
2020	BAL	13	13	17	5	11	0.0	1	0	0	0	0	0	0	0
2021	BAL	11	11	15	6	9	0.0	0	0	0	0	0	0	0	0
Total		94	94	142	82	63	0.5	3	0	0	0	0	0	0	0
Source: NFL.com
