= Seth Roberts (American football) =

American football player (born 1991)

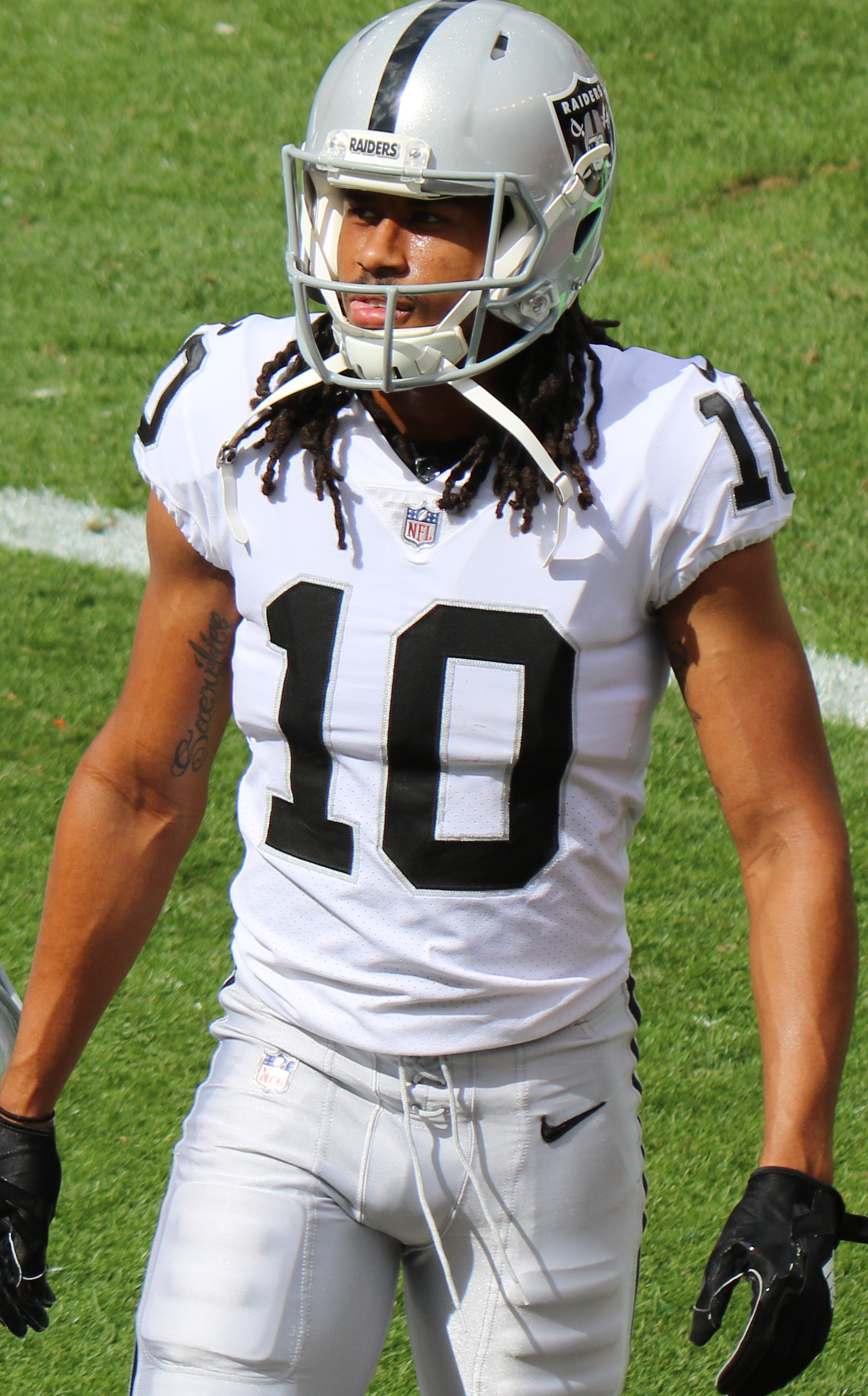
- Roberts with the Oakland Raiders in 2017

No. 10, 11, 15
- Position: Wide receiver

Personal information
- Born: February 22, 1991 (age 35); Moultrie, Georgia, U.S.
- Listed height: 6 ft 2 in (1.88 m)
- Listed weight: 195 lb (88 kg)

Career information
- High school: Maclay School (Tallahassee, Florida)
- College: Pearl River CC (2010-2011); West Alabama (2012-2013)
- NFL draft: 2014: undrafted

Career history
- Oakland Raiders (2014–2018); Baltimore Ravens (2019); Carolina Panthers (2020); Green Bay Packers (2020)*
- * Offseason or practice squad member only

Career NFL statistics
- Receptions: 183
- Receiving yards: 2,128
- Receiving touchdowns: 15
- Stats at Pro Football Reference

Seth Roberts (born February 22, 1991) is an American former professional football player who was a wide receiver in the National Football League (NFL). He played college football for the West Alabama Tigers, and signed with the Oakland Raiders as an undrafted free agent in 2014.

== College career ==
Roberts played junior college football at Pearl River Community College in Poplarville, Mississippi. Roberts later transferred to the University of West Alabama in 2012. As a junior, he caught 22 passes for 312 yards and a touchdown. As a senior in 2013, he had 38 catches for 799 yards and 11 touchdowns, earning All-Conference honors.

== Professional career ==
=== Oakland Raiders ===
Roberts was signed by the Oakland Raiders as an undrafted free agent in 2014. On August 30, 2014, Roberts was waived by the Raiders and was signed to the practice squad the next day. After spending his entire rookie year on the practice squad, he signed a reserve/future contract with the Raiders.

Roberts made the Raiders' final roster in 2015. He played in all 16 games with five starts, recording 32 catches for 480 yards and five touchdowns. In the 2016 season, Roberts played in all 16 games with six starts, recording 38 catches for 397 yards and five touchdowns. On August 30, 2017, Roberts signed a two-year contract extension with the Raiders through 2019. On September 10, against the Tennessee Titans in the season opener, Roberts had only one target, but he was able to record his first and only touchdown of the season as the Raiders won 26–16.

Roberts made 15 appearances (including seven starts) for Oakland during the 2018 season, recording 45 receptions for 494 yards and two touchdowns; he also had three rushes for five scoreless yards. On April 4, 2019, the Raiders released Roberts.

=== Baltimore Ravens ===
Roberts signed with the Baltimore Ravens on April 5, 2019. In his only year with the team, Roberts finished with 21 receptions with 271 yards and two touchdowns.

=== Carolina Panthers ===
On March 26, 2020, Roberts signed with the Carolina Panthers. He was released by the Panthers on October 26.

=== Green Bay Packers ===
On October 31, 2020, Roberts was signed to the Green Bay Packers' practice squad. His practice squad contract with the team expired after the season on February 1, 2021.

== NFL career statistics ==
=== Regular season ===
Season	Team	G	GS	Receiving					Fumbles	
Season	Team	G	GS	Rec	Yds	Avg	TD	Long	Fum	Lost
2015	OAK	16	3	32	480	15.0	5	43	0	0
2016	OAK	16	6	38	397	10.4	5	41	0	0
2017	OAK	15	7	43	455	10.6	1	29	2	2
2018	OAK	15	7	45	494	11.0	2	44	0	0
2019	BAL	16	0	21	271	12.9	2	33	0	0
2020	CAR	7	1	4	31	7.8	0	12	0	0
Total		85	26	183	2,128	11.6	15	44	2	2

=== Postseason ===
Season	Team	G	GS	Receiving					Fumbles	
Season	Team	G	GS	Rec	Yds	Avg	TD	Long	Fum	Lost
2016	OAK	1	1	1	1	1.0	0	1	0	0
2019	BAL	1	0	2	30	15.0	0	26	0	0
Total		2	1	3	31	10.3	0	26	0	0
