= Joe Gomes =

American baseball player

- Outfielder
- Born: December 12, 1908; East Providence, Rhode Island
- Died: February 9, 1986 (aged 77); East Providence, Rhode Island

Negro league baseball debut
- 1932, for the Bacharach Giants

Last appearance
- 1932, for the Bacharach Giants

Teams
- Bacharach Giants (1932)

Joseph Oliver Gomes (Portuguese: Jose Gomes; December 12, 1908 – February 9, 1986) was an American Negro league outfielder in the 1930s.

A native of East Providence, Rhode Island of Cape Verdean descent, Gomes attended East Providence High School, where he was an all-state baseball player, leading the school to the state championship in 1928. He went on to attend Providence College, where he played baseball and football, but dropped out after a racist incident kept him off the field in a game against William and Mary. He went on to play in the Negro leagues, including time with the Bacharach Giants in 1932. Gomes died in his hometown of East Providence in 1986 at age 77.
