= Clive Walford =

American football player (born 1991)

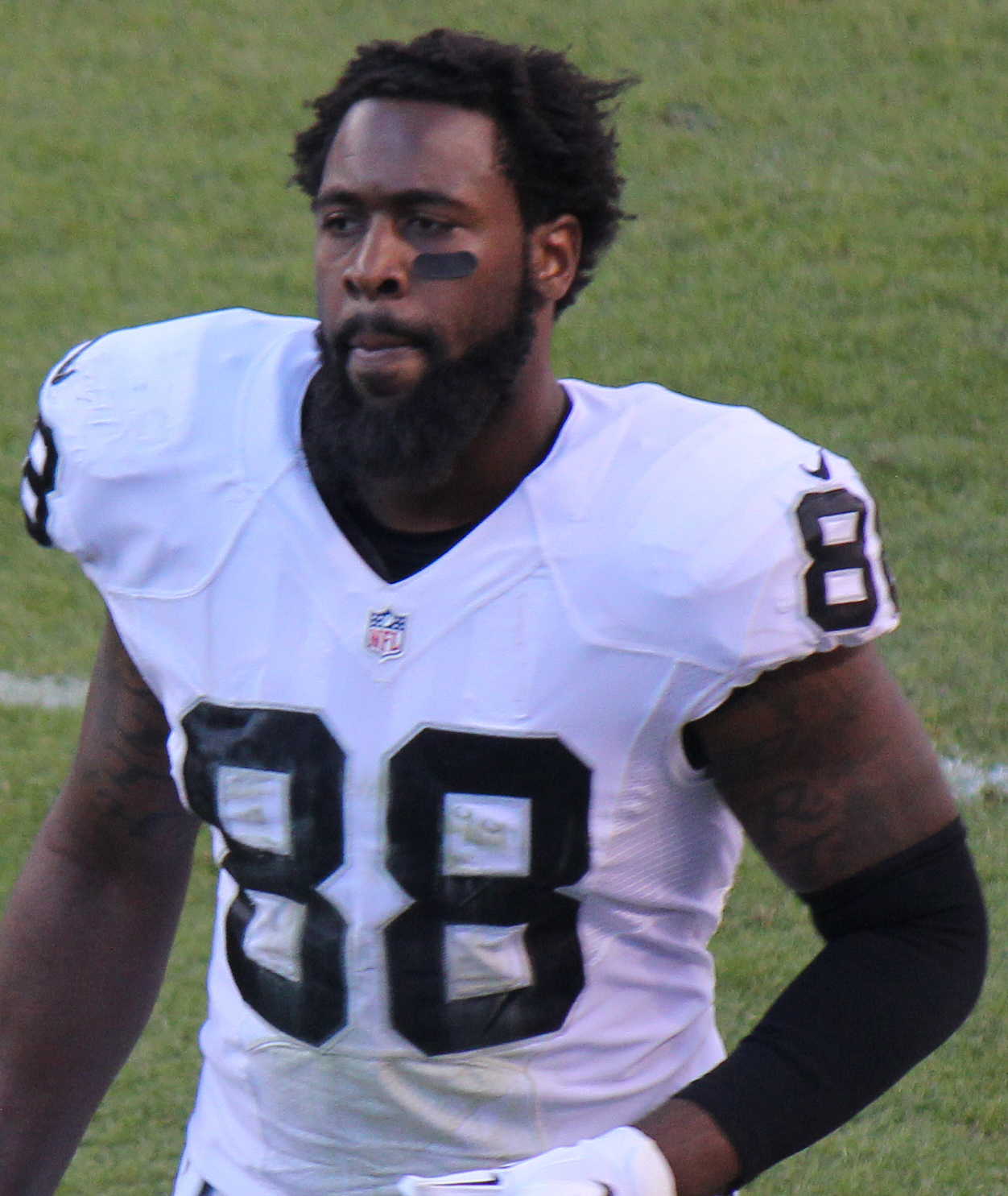
- Walford with the Oakland Raiders in 2015

No. 88, 87
- Position: Tight end

Personal information
- Born: October 1, 1991 (age 35); Miami, Florida, U.S.
- Listed height: 6 ft 4 in (1.93 m)
- Listed weight: 252 lb (114 kg)

Career information
- High school: Glades Central (Belle Glade, Florida)
- College: Miami (FL) (2010–2014)
- NFL draft: 2015: 3rd round, 68th overall pick

Career history
- Oakland Raiders (2015–2017); New York Jets (2018)*; Indianapolis Colts (2018); New York Jets (2018); Miami Dolphins (2019)
- * Offseason or practice squad member only

Awards and highlights
- Second-team All-ACC (2014)

Career NFL statistics
- Receptions: 74
- Receiving yards: 825
- Receiving touchdowns: 6
- Stats at Pro Football Reference

Clive Walford (born October 1, 1991) is an American former professional football player who was a tight end in the National Football League (NFL). He played college football for the Miami Hurricanes and was selected by the Oakland Raiders in the third round of the 2015 NFL draft. Walford was also a member of the Indianapolis Colts, New York Jets, and Miami Dolphins.

== Early life ==
Walford attended Glades Central High School in Belle Glade, Florida, where he was a three-sport star in football, basketball, and track. One of his teammates on the Glades Central football team was Buffalo Bills' wide receiver Kelvin Benjamin. Walford was rated by Rivals.com as a three-star recruit. In July 2009, he committed to the University of Miami to play college football for the Hurricanes football team. Walford also competed in track & field, posting personal-bests of 1.88 meters (6–2) in the high jump and 6.08 meters (19–11) in the long jump.

== College career ==
After he was redshirted as a true freshman in 2010, Walford played in all 12 games with eight starts as a redshirt freshman in 2011. He finished his freshman season with 18 receptions for 172 yards and a touchdown.

As a sophomore in 2012, Walford had 25 receptions for 451 yards and four touchdowns over 12 games, of which he started five.

As a junior in 2013, Walford started 12 of 13 games, recording 34 receptions for 454 yards and two touchdowns.

Walford returned as a starter his senior season.

== Professional career ==
=== Pre-draft ===
On January 2, 2015, it was announced that Walford had accepted his invitation to play in the 2016 Senior Bowl. Throughout the week leading up to the Senior Bowl, Walford had impressive practices and displayed his pass catching and blocking for NFL scouts. He routinely beat linebackers and safeties and coverage and was commended by NFL analysts Daniel Jeremiah, Chase Goodbread, and Mike Mayock. Mayock claimed Walford was, "the most explosive tight end in this year's draft." and, "All he did (this week) was enhance his value." Mayock also stated Walford was pressing Maxx Williams to be the first tight end selected in the upcoming draft. On January 24, 2017, Walford caught one pass for a ten-yard gain as the South lost to the North 13–34. He was one of 19 tight ends to be invited to the NFL Combine and he completed all of the required combine and positional drills. His performance at the combine was described by analysts as "mediocre" and his 40-yard dash time was called "pedestrian". On April 1, 2015, Walford opted to participate at the Miami Hurricanes pro day, along with Phillip Dorsett, Duke Johnson, Ereck Flowers, Anthony Chickillo, Denzel Perryman, Jon Feliciano, Shane McDermott, Thurston Armbrister, Olsen Pierre, Ladarius Gunter, Jake Heaps, and three other teammates. Due to a hamstring injury, Walford chose to only perform positional drills for the team representatives and scouts from all 32 NFL teams, that included head coaches Todd Bowles (New York Jets), Sean Payton (New Orleans Saints), and Mike Tomlin (Pittsburgh Steelers). During the pre-draft process, he had private visit and workouts with the Miami Dolphins, Buffalo Bills, Kansas City Chiefs, Pittsburgh Steelers, Atlanta Falcons, and Green Bay Packers. He had private visits or workouts with a few teams, including the Chiefs. At the end of the pre-draft process, Walford was projected to be a second or third round pick. He was ranked the second best tight end prospect in the draft by NFL analysts Charles Davis, Mike Mayock, Lance Zierlein, NFLDraftScout.com, and Sports Illustrated.

Pre-draft measurables
Height	Weight	Arm length	Hand span	40-yard dash	10-yard split	20-yard split	20-yard shuttle	Three-cone drill	Vertical jump	Broad jump	Bench press
6 ft 4 in (1.93 m)	251 lb (114 kg)	34 in (0.86 m)	10 1/4 in (0.26 m)	4.79 s	1.72 s	2.84 s	4.57 s	7.32 s	35 in (0.89 m)	10 ft 0 in (3.05 m)	20 reps
All values from NFL Combine

=== Oakland Raiders ===
==== 2015 season ====
The Oakland Raiders selected Walford in the third round (68th overall) of the 2015 NFL draft. He was the second tight end selected in the draft behind Maxx Williams (second round, 55th overall). The Raiders also selected his Miami Hurricanes' teammate Jon Feliciano in the fourth round (128th overall).

On June 16, 2015, the Raiders signed Walford to a four-year, $3.34 million contract that includes a signing bonus of $795,504.

Throughout his first training camp with the Raiders, Walford competed with Mychal Rivera, Lee Smith, Brian Leonhardt, and Gabe Holmes for the job as the starting tight end. He had an impressive performance during the Raiders' organized team activities and mini camp, but missed the beginning of training camp with a hamstring injury. Walford missed the Raiders' last three preseason games after he suffered a knee injury. Head coach Jack Del Rio named Walford the third tight end on the Raiders' depth chart to begin the season, behind Smith and Rivera.

Walford made his NFL debut in the season-opener against the Cincinnati Bengals and caught his first NFL reception on a one-yard pass from Derek Carr during the 33–13 loss. During Week 5 against the Denver Broncos, Walford caught a 33-yard pass in a 16–10 loss. The 33-yard reception was the longest of his rookie season. Two weeks later, Walford earned his first NFL start and made two receptions for 42 yards as the Raiders defeated the San Diego Chargers by a score 37–29. He also scored his first NFL touchdown while being covered by Chargers' cornerback Jimmy Wilson, catching a 23-yard pass from Carr in the second quarter. On December 6, 2015, he caught a season-high five passes for a season-high 53 yards during a 34–20 loss to the Chiefs.

Walford finished his rookie season with a total of 28 receptions for 329 yards and three touchdowns in 16 games and two starts.

==== 2016 season ====
Entering training camp, Walford was expected to be the starting tight end. Although he surpassed Rivera on the depth chart, he was named the backup to Smith. Smith remained the starting tight end due to his superior blocking ability.

On September 18, 2016, Walford caught a season-high six passes for 58 yards and scored a 31-yard touchdown during a 35–28 loss to the Falcons. During a Week 4 matchup at the Baltimore Ravens, he made his first start of the season and had two receptions for 23 yards in the narrow 28–27 victory. However, Walford left the game after suffering a knee injury and missed the Week 5 matchup against the Chargers. During the game, Smith suffered a fracture to his lower leg and was placed on injured reserve for the rest of the season on October 5, 2016, which expanded Walford's role. On November 27, 2016, Walford caught three passes for 43 yards and a touchdown as the Raiders defeated the Carolina Panthers 35–32. His touchdown reception was on a 12-yard pass from Carr to tie the game in the fourth quarter.

Walford finished his second professional season with 33 receptions for 359 yards and three touchdowns in 15 games and eight starts.

==== 2017 season ====
During the offseason, the Raiders and offensive coordinator Bill Musgrave mutually parted ways and he was replaced by Todd Downing. Walford competed with Jared Cook, Smith, Holmes, Ryan O'Malley, Cooper Helfet, and Pharaoh Brown throughout training camp for a job as the starting tight end. Del Rio named Walford the Raiders' third tight end behind Cook and Smith to start the regular season.

Through the first 12 games, Walford was limited to three receptions for 10 yards. During Week 13, he caught four passes for 57 yards in the 24–17 victory over the New York Giants. He suffered a concussion in Week 14 and was placed on injured reserve on December 23. Walford finished the 2017 season with nine receptions for 80 yards.

On March 27, 2018, Walford was released by the Raiders.

=== New York Jets (first stint) ===
On April 2, 2018, the New York Jets claimed Walford off waivers. On September 1, Walford was released.

=== Indianapolis Colts ===
On November 28, 2018, Walford was signed by the Indianapolis Colts. On December 7, Walford was released.

=== New York Jets (second stint) ===
On December 27, 2018, Walford was re-signed by the Jets. He appeared in one game for the Jets in the 2018 season.

=== Miami Dolphins ===
On March 13, 2019, Walford signed a one-year contract with the Miami Dolphins. He was released on August 27. Walford was re-signed on October 30. He finished the 2019 season with four receptions for 57 yards in seven games and three starts.

== NFL career statistics ==
=== Regular season ===
Season	Team	Games		Receiving					Rushing					Fumbles	
Season	Team	GP	GS	Rec	Yds	Avg	Lng	TD	Att	Yds	Avg	Lng	TD	Fum	Lost
2015	OAK	16	2	28	283	11.8	33	3	0	0	0.0	0	0	0	0
2016	OAK	15	8	33	359	10.9	31	3	0	0	0.0	0	0	0	0
2017	OAK	13	0	9	80	8.9	26	0	0	0	0.0	0	0	0	0
2018	NYJ	1	1	0	0	0.0	0	0	0	0	0.0	0	0	0	0
2019	MIA	7	3	4	57	14.3	19	0	0	0	0.0	0	0	0	0
Career		52	14	74	825	11.1	33	6	0	0	0.0	0	0	0	0

=== Postseason ===
Season	Team	Games		Receiving					Rushing					Fumbles	
Season	Team	GP	GS	Rec	Yds	Avg	Lng	TD	Att	Yds	Avg	Lng	TD	Fum	Lost
2016	OAK	1	1	2	16	8.0	9	0	0	0	0.0	0	0	0	0
Career		1	1	2	16	8.0	9	0	0	0	0.0	0	0	0	0

== Personal life ==
On May 3, 2016, it was reported that Walford suffered a knee injury in an ATV accident. He was unable to participate in spring practices and rejoined the team during the start of training camp.
