= Keenan Lambert =

American football player (born 1992)

No. 32, 38
- Position: Safety

Personal information
- Born: February 28, 1992 (age 34); Norfolk, Virginia, U.S.
- Listed height: 6 ft 0 in (1.83 m)
- Listed weight: 210 lb (95 kg)

Career information
- High school: Maury (Norfolk)
- College: Norfolk State
- NFL draft: 2015: undrafted

Career history
- Seattle Seahawks (2015)*; Oakland Raiders (2015); Seattle Seahawks (2016)*
- * Offseason or practice squad member only

Career NFL statistics
- Games played: 5
- Stats at Pro Football Reference

Keenan Lambert (born February 28, 1992) is an American former professional football player who was a safety in the National Football League (NFL). He played college football for the Norfolk State Spartans. He was signed as an undrafted free agent by the Seattle Seahawks on May 8, 2015. He is the half brother of former Seahawks safety Kam Chancellor.

Pre-draft measurables
Height	Weight	Arm length	Hand span	40-yard dash	10-yard split	20-yard split	20-yard shuttle	Three-cone drill	Vertical jump	Broad jump	Bench press
5 ft 11 7/8 in (1.83 m)	209 lb (95 kg)	31 1/4 in (0.79 m)	9 1/8 in (0.23 m)	4.62 s	1.65 s	2.70 s	4.35 s	7.14 s	31.0 in (0.79 m)	9 ft 6 in (2.90 m)	17 reps
All values from Pro Day

== Oakland Raiders ==
Lambert played in five games for the Raiders and was waived on October 15, 2015. He was re-signed to the Raiders practice squad on October 17, 2015.
