= Dexter McDonald =

American football player (born 1991)

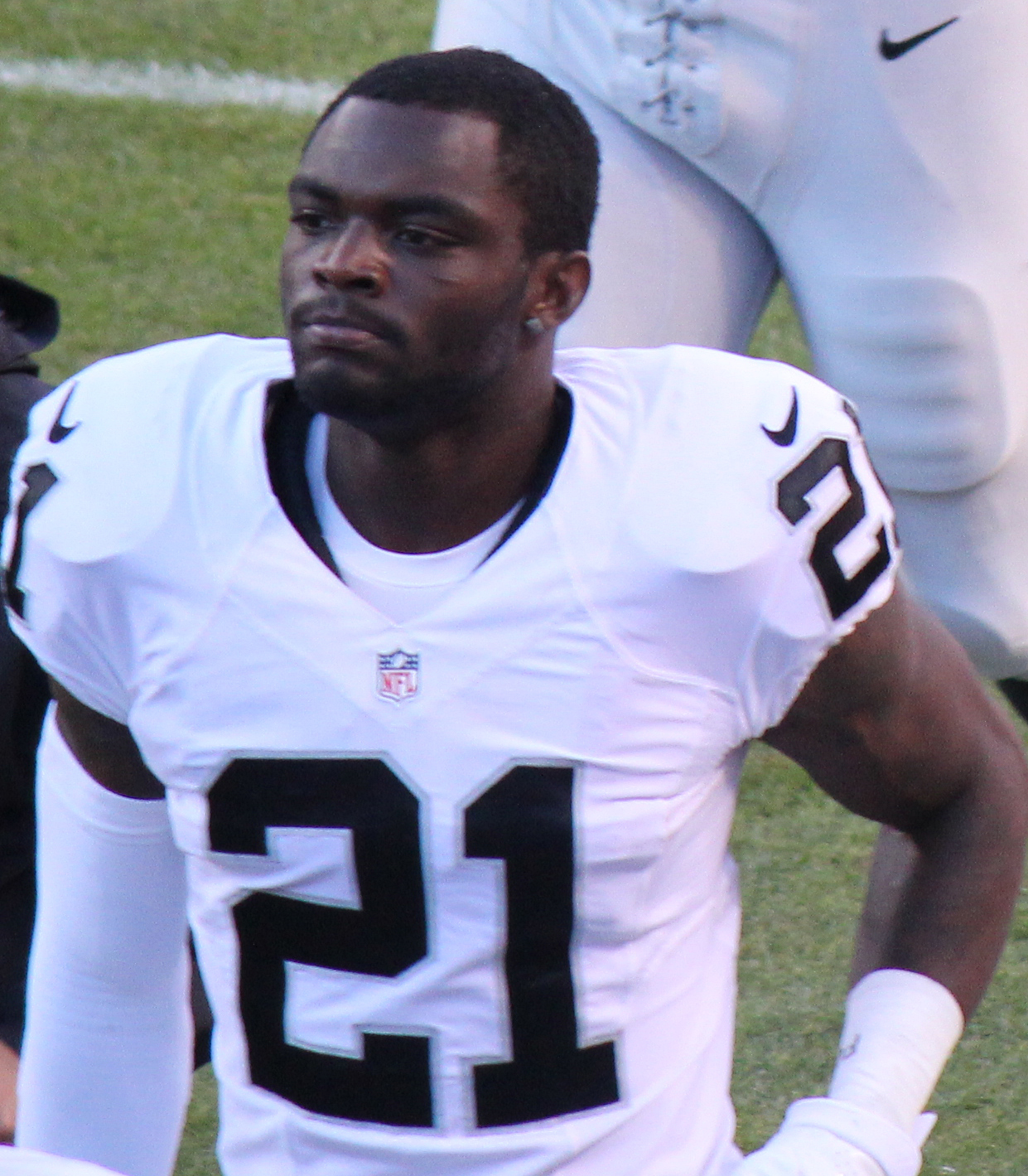
- McDonald with the Oakland Raiders in 2015

No. 21, 23
- Position: Cornerback

Personal information
- Born: November 30, 1991 (age 34); Kansas City, Missouri, U.S.
- Listed height: 6 ft 1 in (1.85 m)
- Listed weight: 200 lb (91 kg)

Career information
- High school: Rockhurst (Kansas City)
- College: Kansas
- NFL draft: 2015: 7th round, 242nd overall pick

Career history
- Oakland Raiders (2015–2018)

Career NFL statistics
- Total tackles: 49
- Forced fumbles: 1
- Pass deflections: 7
- Stats at Pro Football Reference

Dexter McDonald (born November 30, 1991) is an American former professional football player who was a cornerback in the National Football League (NFL). He played college football for the Kansas Jayhawks and was selected by the Oakland Raiders in the seventh round of the 2015 NFL draft.

== Professional career ==
On March 25, 2015, McDonald worked out at Kansas' pro day, where he wowed scouts by jumping higher than the measuring device could measure. After several adjustments and re-jumps, the scouts credited him with a 40.5 inch standing vertical jump. He then created more buzz by recording an 11'-2" broad jump.

Pre-draft measurables
Height	Weight	40-yard dash	10-yard split	20-yard split	20-yard shuttle	Three-cone drill	Vertical jump	Broad jump	Bench press
6 ft 1 in (1.85 m)	201 lb (91 kg)	4.37 s	1.56 s	2.56 s	4.56 s	6.96 s	40.5 in (1.03 m)	11 ft 2 in (3.40 m)	10 reps
All values from Kansas Pro Day

McDonald was selected by the Oakland Raiders in the seventh round, 242nd overall, in the 2015 NFL draft. On September 1, 2018, he was waived/injured by the Raiders and was placed on injured reserve.
