= Shaun Herock =

American football executive

Miami Dolphins
- Title: Senior personnel executive

Personal information
- Born: Pittsburgh, Pennsylvania, U.S.

Career information
- College: Richmond

Career history
- Green Bay Packers (1994–2011) Assistant director of college scouting; Oakland Raiders (2012–2018) Director of college scouting; Oakland Raiders (2018) Interim general manager; Cleveland Browns (2019–2020) Scout; Cleveland Browns (2020–2021) National scout; Las Vegas Raiders (2022–2024) Senior personnel advisor; Cleveland Browns (2025) Senior college personnel advisor; Miami Dolphins (2026–present) Senior personnel executive

Awards and highlights
- 2× Super Bowl champion (XXXI, XLV)

Shaun Herock is an American football executive who currently serves as a senior college personnel advisor for the Cleveland Browns of the National Football League (NFL). He previously served as an assistant director of college scouting for the Green Bay Packers and director of college scouting for the Oakland Raiders. Herock also served as the Raiders' interim general manager in 2018 after the team fired general manager Reggie McKenzie.

== College career ==
During college Herock played center and offensive tackle for the Richmond Spiders football team.

== Executive career ==
=== Atlanta Falcons ===
Herock served as an intern in the scouting department of the Atlanta Falcons.

=== Green Bay Packers ===
In 1994, he was hired by the Packers after having served as an intern for them as well, and ascended to the assistant director's spot in 2001.

=== Oakland Raiders ===
In May 2012, he joined his former colleague Reggie McKenzie in Oakland. He was the second Herock to have worked for the Raiders, following his father Ken. On December 10, 2018, Herock was named interim general manager after the dismissal of Reggie McKenzie. Following the season, he was not retained in either capacity by the Raiders and was replaced as general manager by Mike Mayock and as director of college scouting by Jim Abrams.

=== Cleveland Browns ===
Herock was hired by the Cleveland Browns in a personnel role in June 2019. He was promoted to national scout on May 29, 2020.

=== Las Vegas Raiders ===
On February 21, 2022, Herock returned to the Raiders, now based in Las Vegas, as a personnel advisor to new general manager Dave Ziegler.

=== Cleveland Browns (second stint) ===
On May 14, 2025, the Cleveland Browns hired Herock to serve in a personnel role.

=== Miami Dolphins ===
In May 2026, it was reported that Herock would be joining his former Green Bay Packers colleague Jon-Eric Sullivan in Miami where Sullivan became the GM earlier in the offseason. Herock's title is senior personnel executive.

== Personal life ==
Born in Pittsburgh, Pennsylvania, Shaun is the son of former NFL player, scout, and general manager Ken Herock. Shaun is a graduate of the University of Richmond, he played college football as a center and offensive tackle.
