= 2017 Oakland Raiders season =

58th season in franchise history

- Owner: Mark Davis
- General manager: Reggie McKenzie
- Head coach: Jack Del Rio
- Home stadium: Oakland–Alameda County Coliseum

Results
- Record: 6–10
- Division place: 3rd AFC West
- Playoffs: Did not qualify
- Pro Bowlers: DE Khalil Mack; C Rodney Hudson; LG Kelechi Osemele; LT Donald Penn; QB Derek Carr

Uniform
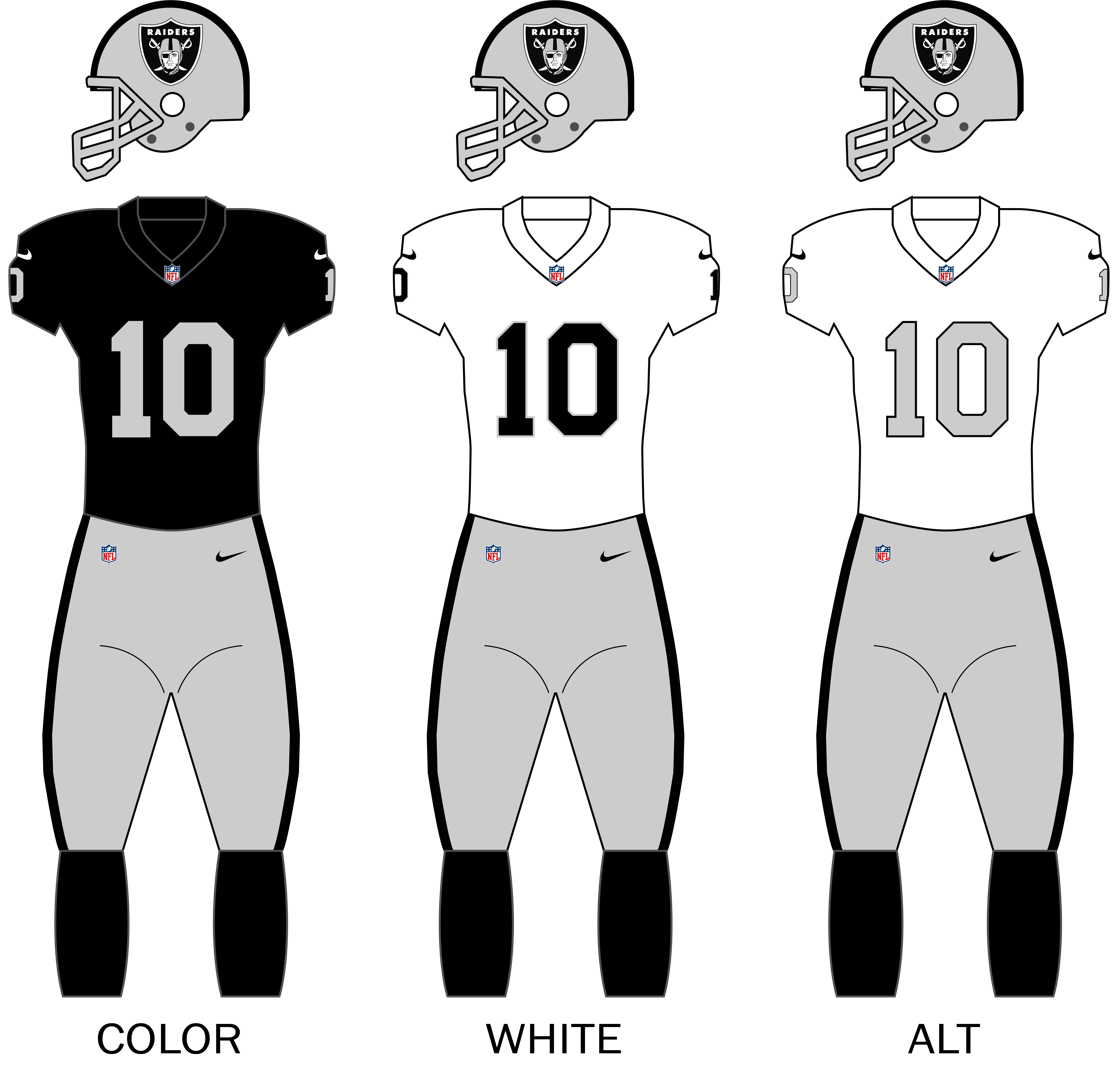

The 2017 season was the Oakland Raiders' 48th in the National Football League (NFL), their 58th overall, their 23rd since their return to Oakland, and the third and final season under head coach Jack Del Rio. It was the first season for the team since the franchise announced its impending relocation to Las Vegas.

The Raiders began the season on September 10 at the Tennessee Titans and finished the season December 31 at the Los Angeles Chargers. The Raiders, as they did in 2016, played one home game in Mexico City, this time against the New England Patriots. Although the league approved the Raiders' eventual relocation to Las Vegas on March 27, 2017, the team still maintained its lease at the Oakland–Alameda County Coliseum and intended to use the stadium for at least the 2017 and 2018 seasons and the 2019 season.

After a 12–4 record the prior season that saw the Raiders return to the playoffs for the first time since 2002, the Raiders finished the season 6–10, having the biggest drop in number of wins since 2003. They finished in third place in the AFC West and failed to qualify for the playoffs. The season also marked a return to a double-digit loss record for the first time since 2014.

The offense struggled under first year offensive coordinator Todd Downing, ranking 17th (tied with Denver) in yardage rankings, 25th in rushing yards, and 23rd in points. The defense also struggled under Ken Norton Jr., having no interceptions under Norton. Norton was fired on November 21, 2017. However, the defense showed some improvement under Norton's replacement, John Pagano.

The Raiders fired head coach Jack Del Rio on December 31, 2017, following the final game of the season and a four-game losing streak.

This season is notable for former Seattle Seahawks running back and Oakland native Marshawn Lynch coming out of retirement to play for the Raiders before their move to Las Vegas.

== Offseason ==
=== Free agent signings ===
Position	Player	Age	2016 Team	Contract
TE	Jared Cook	30	Green Bay Packers	2 years, $10.6 million
WR	Cordarrelle Patterson	26	Minnesota Vikings	2 years, $8.5 million
OT	Marshall Newhouse	28	New York Giants	2 years, $3.5 million
LS	Jon Condo	35	Oakland Raiders	1 year, $1 million
OLB	Jelani Jenkins	25	Miami Dolphins	1 year, $1 million
QB	EJ Manuel	27	Buffalo Bills	1 year, $800,000
DE	IK Enemkpali	26	Buffalo Bills	1 year
LB	Rufus Johnson	28	Washington Redskins	1 year

=== Losses ===
Position	Player	Age	2017 Team
RB	Latavius Murray	27	Minnesota Vikings
LB	Malcolm Smith	27	San Francisco 49ers
DT	Stacy McGee	27	Washington Redskins
OT	Menelik Watson	28	Denver Broncos
WR	Andre Holmes	28	Buffalo Bills
SS	Brynden Trawick	27	Tennessee Titans
CB	D.J. Hayden	26	Detroit Lions
FS	Nate Allen	27	Miami Dolphins
TE	Mychal Rivera	26	Jacksonville Jaguars
QB	Matt McGloin	27	Philadelphia Eagles
LB	Perry Riley	28	TBD
OT	Austin Howard	30	Baltimore Ravens
RB	Taiwan Jones	28	Buffalo Bills

=== Trades ===
Player/picks received	Player/compensation sent	Team
RB Marshawn Lynch; 6th round pick (2018 draft)	5th round pick (2018 draft)	Seattle Seahawks

=== Contract extensions ===
- April 26, 2017 – Raiders sign RB Marshawn Lynch to a two-year deal that will reportedly pay him a base salary of $9 million and has a maximum value of $16.5 million with incentives.
- June 22, 2017 – Raiders sign QB Derek Carr to a five-year, $125 million contract extension, making him the highest-paid player in the NFL.
- June 29, 2017 – Raiders sign OG Gabe Jackson to a five-year $56 million contract extension.

=== Draft ===
2017 Oakland Raiders Draft
Round	Selection	Player	Position	College
1	24	Gareon Conley	CB	Ohio State
2	56	Obi Melifonwu	S	UConn
3	88	Eddie Vanderdoes	DT	UCLA
4	130	David Sharpe	OT	Florida
5	168	Marquel Lee	LB	Wake Forest
7	221	Shalom Luani	S	Washington State
7	231	Jylan Ware	OT	Alabama State
7	242	Elijah Hood	RB	North Carolina
7	244	Treyvon Hester	DT	Toledo

== Staff ==
2017 Oakland Raiders staff
Front office: Owner – Mark Davis; President – Marc Badain; Executive vice president/general counsel – Dan Ventrelle; General manager – Reggie McKenzie; Director of football administration – Tom Delaney; Director of player personnel – Joey Clinkscales; Assistant director of player personnel – Trey Scott; Director of pro personnel – Dane Vandernat; Assistant director of pro personnel – Von Hutchins; Director of college scouting – Shaun Herock; Assistant director of college scouting – Brad Kaplan; Head coaches: Head coach – Jack Del Rio; Assistant head coach/defense (Interim Defensive Coordinator) – John Pagano (November 22, 2017-onwards as defensive coordinator); Offensive coaches: Offensive coordinator – Todd Downing; Quarterbacks – Jake Peetz; Running backs – Bernie Parmalee; Wide receivers – Rob Moore; Assistant wide receivers – Nick Holz; Tight ends – Bobby Johnson; Offensive line – Mike Tice; Assistant offensive line – Tim Holt; Offensive quality control – Nate Tice	Defensive coaches: Defensive coordinator – Ken Norton Jr (fired November 21, 2017); Defensive line – Jethro Franklin; Linebackers – Sal Sunseri; Outside linebackers – Travis Smith; Cornerbacks – Rod Woodson; Safeties – Brent Vieselmeyer; Defensive assistant – Sam Anno; Special teams coaches: Special teams coordinator – Brad Seely; Assistant special teams – Tracy Smith; Strength and conditioning: Head strength and conditioning – Joe Gomes; Assistant strength and conditioning – Darryl Eto; Strength and conditioning assistant – Hugh Fullagar; Strength and conditioning assistant – Wesley Miller

== Final roster ==
2017 Oakland Raiders roster
Quarterbacks (QB): 4 Derek Carr; 18 Connor Cook; 3 EJ Manuel; Running backs (RB): 24 Marshawn Lynch; 49 Jamize Olawale FB; 30 Jalen Richard; 33 DeAndré Washington; Wide receivers (WR): 89 Amari Cooper; 15 Michael Crabtree; 16 Johnny Holton; 84 Cordarrelle Patterson; 10 Seth Roberts; 19 Isaac Whitney; Tight ends (TE): 81 Pharaoh Brown; 87 Jared Cook; 86 Lee Smith	Offensive linemen (OL): 74 Vadal Alexander T/G; 61 Rodney Hudson C; 66 Gabe Jackson G; 73 Marshall Newhouse T; 70 Kelechi Osemele G; 71 David Sharpe T; 68 Ian Silberman G; 62 James Stone C; 69 Jylan Ware T; Defensive linemen (DL): 96 Denico Autry DE/DT; 97 Mario Edwards Jr. DE; 78 Justin Ellis DT; 90 Treyvon Hester DT; 75 Darius Latham DT; 52 Khalil Mack DE; 94 Eddie Vanderdoes DT; 95 Jihad Ward DE	Linebackers (LB): 53 NaVorro Bowman MLB; 91 Shilique Calhoun OLB; 47 James Cowser OLB; 51 Bruce Irvin OLB; 55 Marquel Lee MLB; 50 Nicholas Morrow OLB; 43 Brady Sheldon LB; Defensive backs (DB): 29 David Amerson CB; 38 T. J. Carrie CB; 32 Antonio Hamilton CB; 41 Erik Harris SS; 42 Karl Joseph SS; 26 Shalom Luani SS; 23 Dexter McDonald CB; 39 Keith McGill FS; 27 Reggie Nelson FS; 21 Sean Smith CB; Special teams (ST): 59 Jon Condo LS; 7 Marquette King P; 2 Giorgio Tavecchio K	Practice squad: 99 Fadol Brown DE; 14 Keon Hatcher WR; 31 Darius Hillary CB; 34 Elijah Hood RB; 83 Marcus Lucas TE; 40 Stefan McClure SS; 37 Tevin Mitchel CB; 93 Joby Saint Fleur DE; 65 Jordan Simmons G; 64 Shakir Soto DT; Reserve: 22 Gareon Conley CB (IR); 76 Jon Feliciano C/G (IR); 57 Cory James OLB (IR); 11 Sebastian Janikowski K (IR); 79 Denver Kirkland G (IR); 20 Obi Melifonwu SS (IR); 72 Donald Penn T (IR); 99 Aldon Smith OLB (Susp.); 88 Clive Walford TE (IR); Rookies in italics 53 active, 9 reserve, 10 practice squad

== Preseason ==
The Raiders' preliminary preseason schedule was announced on April 10. In preparation for the team's eventual move to Las Vegas, the Raiders sought to play at least one of their two preseason games at Sam Boyd Stadium. When the preseason opponents were announced, both home games were scheduled for Oakland.

=== Donald Penn holdout ===
Offensive tackle Donald Penn chose not to report to training camp on July 28 as he was unhappy with his contract which was to pay him $6.2 million this season in the second season of a two-year deal. Penn ended his holdout without a new deal and reported to the team on August 23. Penn, sought to be paid as a top ten LT in the league, said, “We have a great owner, a good GM. I came in here putting my trust in them.”

=== Janikowski contract issue ===
Prior to Week 1 of the regular season, the Raiders sought to have kicker Sebastian Janikowski agree to rework his contract to pay him less than the $4 million owed to him for the 2017 season. Janikowski remained on the roster as of September 5, meaning he was guaranteed to be paid $238,000. The Raiders reportedly worked out three kickers in anticipation of being unable to reach an agreement with Janikowski. On September 6, Janikowski agreed to a $1 million pay cut to stay with the team. Three days later, Janikowski was placed on injured reserve due to a back injury.

=== Schedule ===
Week	Date	Opponent	Result	Record	Venue	Recap
1	August 12	at Arizona Cardinals	L 10–20	0–1	University of Phoenix Stadium	Recap
2	August 19	Los Angeles Rams	L 21–24	0–2	Oakland–Alameda County Coliseum	Recap
3	August 26	at Dallas Cowboys	L 20–24	0–3	AT&T Stadium	Recap
4	August 31	Seattle Seahawks	L 13–17	0–4	Oakland–Alameda County Coliseum	Recap

== Regular season ==
=== Schedule ===
Week	Date	Opponent	Result	Record	Venue	Recap
1	September 10	at Tennessee Titans	**W** 26–16	1–0	Nissan Stadium	Recap
2	September 17	New York Jets	**W** 45–20	2–0	Oakland–Alameda County Coliseum	Recap
3	September 24	at Washington Redskins	**L** 10–27	2–1	FedExField	Recap
4	October 1	at **Denver Broncos**	**L** 10–16	2–2	Sports Authority Field at Mile High	Recap
5	October 8	Baltimore Ravens	**L** 17–30	2–3	Oakland–Alameda County Coliseum	Recap
6	October 15	**Los Angeles Chargers**	**L** 16–17	2–4	Oakland–Alameda County Coliseum	Recap
7	October 19	**Kansas City Chiefs**	**W** 31–30	3–4	Oakland–Alameda County Coliseum	Recap
8	October 29	at Buffalo Bills	**L** 14–34	3–5	New Era Field	Recap
9	November 5	at Miami Dolphins	**W** 27–24	4–5	Hard Rock Stadium	Recap
10	Bye					
11	November 19	New England Patriots	**L** 8–33	4–6	Estadio Azteca (Mexico City)	Recap
12	November 26	**Denver Broncos**	**W** 21–14	5–6	Oakland–Alameda County Coliseum	Recap
13	December 3	New York Giants	**W** 24–17	6–6	Oakland–Alameda County Coliseum	Recap
14	December 10	at **Kansas City Chiefs**	**L** 15–26	6–7	Arrowhead Stadium	Recap
15	December 17	Dallas Cowboys	**L** 17–20	6–8	Oakland–Alameda County Coliseum	Recap
16	December 25	at Philadelphia Eagles	**L** 10–19	6–9	Lincoln Financial Field	Recap
17	December 31	at **Los Angeles Chargers**	**L** 10–30	6–10	StubHub Center	Recap

Note: Intra-division opponents are in bold text.

=== Game summaries ===
==== Week 1: at Tennessee Titans ====
Week One: Oakland Raiders at Tennessee Titans – Game summary

Quarter	1	2	3	4	Total
**Raiders**	7	6	3	10	**26**
Titans	7	3	3	3	**16**

at Nissan Stadium, Nashville, Tennessee

- Date: September 10
- Game time: 12:00 p.m. CDT/10:00 a.m. PDT
- Game weather: 72 °F (22 °C), sunny
- Game attendance: 69,089
- Referee: Jerome Boger
- TV announcers (CBS): Jim Nantz, Tony Romo and Tracy Wolfson
- Recap, Gamebook

Game information

**First quarter**

- OAK – Amari Cooper 8–yard pass from Derek Carr (Giorgio Tavecchio kick), 12:49. Raiders 7–0. **Drive: 4 plays, 50 yards, 2:11.**
- TEN – Marcus Mariota 10–yard run (Ryan Succop kick), 6:58. Tied 7–7. **Drive: 12 plays, 75 yards, 5:51.**

**Second quarter**

- OAK – Giorgio Tavecchio 20–yard field goal, 14:55. Raiders 10–7. **Drive: 15 plays, 73 yards, 7:03.**
- TEN – Ryan Succop 23–yard field goal, 0:43. Tied 10–10. **Drive: 15 plays, 93 yards, 6:20.**
- OAK – Giorgio Tavecchio 52–yard field goal, 0:00. Raiders 13–10. **Drive: 5 plays, 41 yards, 0:43.**

**Third quarter**

- OAK – Giorgio Tavecchio 52–yard field goal, 4:31. Raiders 16–10. **Drive: 8 plays, 29 yards, 4:11.**
- TEN – Ryan Succop 26–yard field goal, 0:00. Raiders 16–13. **Drive: 9 plays, 67 yards, 4:31.**

**Fourth quarter**

- OAK – Seth Roberts 19–yard pass from Derek Carr (Giorgio Tavecchio kick), 11:58. Raiders 23–13. **Drive: 7 plays, 70 yards, 3:02.**
- TEN – Ryan Succop 52–yard field goal, 4:49. Raiders 23–16. **Drive: 8 plays, 46 yards, 1:55.**
- OAK – Giorgio Tavecchio 43–yard field goal, 1:09. Raiders 26–16. **Drive: 9 plays, 34 yards, 3:40.**

**Top passers**

- OAK – Derek Carr – 22/32, 262 yards, 2 TD
- TEN – Marcus Mariota – 25/41, 256 yards

**Top rushers**

- OAK – Marshawn Lynch – 18 rushes, 76 yards
- TEN – DeMarco Murray – 12 rushes, 44 yards

**Top receivers**

- OAK – Michael Crabtree – 6 receptions, 83 yards
- TEN – Delanie Walker – 7 receptions, 76 yards

**Top tacklers**

- OAK – Karl Joseph – 9 tackles
- TEN – Kevin Byard – 8 tackles

For the third consecutive season, the Raiders traveled to Nashville to take on the Tennessee Titans. It also marked the second consecutive year that the Raiders began the season on the road. On September 9, one day before the first game of the season, the Raiders placed Sebastian Janikowski on injured reserve due to an injured back. They signed Giorgio Tavecchio off the practice squad to do the kicking.

The Raiders started well as the Titans tried to surprise the Raiders with an onside kick on the opening kickoff which the Raiders recovered. Four plays later, Derek Carr hit Amari Cooper who bowled into the endzone for an eight-yard touchdown pass to give the Raiders the lead 7–0. The Titans answered on their ensuing drive, going 75 yards on 12 plays with Marcus Mariota rushing for a 10-yard touchdown to tie the game. The Raiders came back as Tavecchio hit his first career field goal, a 20-yarder, to give the Raiders a 10–7 lead. After exchanging punts in the early part of the second quarter, the Titans tied the game with 43 seconds remaining in the half on a Ryan Succop 23-yard field goal. The Raider offense moved 41 yards with time winding down to set up Tavecchio's second field goal, from 52 yards out, to give the Raiders the halftime lead 13–10.

In the second half, the Raider defense held the Titans to punts on consecutive drives as the Raiders notched another 52-yard field goal to extend the lead to 16–10 with a little over four minutes left in the third period. The Raider defense prevented a Titans touchdown on the ensuing drive, forcing the Titans to settle for a 26-yard field goal which narrowed the gap to 16–13 as the period expired. In the fourth quarter, Carr led the Raiders on a seven play, 70-yard drive capped off by a Seth Roberts 19-yard touchdown reception. The Raiders defense, which had struggled immensely the previous year, forced the Titans to punt and then held them to a field goal with 4:49 remaining. Another Tavecchio field goal, this time from 43 yards out, extended the lead to 26–16 with 1:14 left in the game. The Titans could muster no more, missing a 52-yard field goal with 12 seconds remaining as the Raiders pulled out the win 26–16.

In the win, Tavecchio became the first kicker in NFL history to make two 50-yard field goals in an NFL debut. Following his performance, Tavecchio was named AFC Special Teams Player of the Week. Marshawn Lynch ran for 76 yards on 18 carries in his Raider debut. Carr threw for 262 yards with two touchdown passes to lead the Raiders to a 1–0 record to start the season.

==== Week 2: vs. New York Jets ====
Week Two: New York Jets at Oakland Raiders – Game summary

Quarter	1	2	3	4	Total
Jets	0	10	3	7	**20**
**Raiders**	7	14	7	17	**45**

at Oakland–Alameda County Coliseum, Oakland, California

- Date: September 17
- Game time: 1:05 p.m. PDT
- Game weather: 70 °F (21 °C), sunny
- Game attendance: 54,729
- Referee: Jeff Triplette
- TV announcers (CBS): Ian Eagle, Dan Fouts and Evan Washburn
- Recap, Gamebook

Game information

**First quarter**

- OAK – Michael Crabtree 2-yard pass from Derek Carr (Giorgio Tavecchio kick), 4:58. Raiders 7–0. **Drive: 11 plays, 81 yards, 5:59.**

**Second quarter**

- OAK – Michael Crabtree 26-yard pass from Derek Carr (Giorgio Tavecchio kick), 13:00. Raiders 14–0. **Drive: 8 plays, 85 yards, 4:38.**
- NYJ – Jermaine Kearse 34-yard pass from Josh McCown (Chandler Catanzaro kick), 9:15. Raiders 14–7. **Drive: 7 plays, 75 yards, 3:47.**
- NYJ – Chandler Catanzaro 46-yard field goal, 3:11. Raiders 14–10. **Drive: 11 plays, 62 yards, 4:40.**
- OAK – Marshawn Lynch 2-yard run (Giorgio Tavecchio kick), 0:23. Raiders 21–10. **Drive: 3 plays, 4 yards, 1:29.**

**Third quarter**

- NYJ – Chandler Catanzaro 40-yard field goal, 7:14. Raiders 21–13. **Drive: 12 plays, 45 yards, 7:50.**
- OAK – Cordarrelle Patterson 43-yard run (Giorgio Tavecchio kick), 3:39. Raiders 28–13. **Drive: 7 plays, 84 yards, 3:39.**

**Fourth quarter**

- OAK – Jalen Richard 52-yard run (Giorgio Tavecchio kick), 12:59. Raiders 35–13. **Drive: 4 plays, 79 yards, 2:00.**
- OAK – Michael Crabtree 1-yard pass from Derek Carr (Giorgio Tavecchio kick), 12:32. Raiders 42–13. **Drive: 1 play, 18 yards, 0:10.**
- NYJ – Jermaine Kearse 11-yard pass from Josh McCown (Chandler Catanzaro kick), 8:47. Raiders 42–20. **Drive: 10 plays, 75 yards, 3:45.**
- OAK – Giorgio Tavecchio 29-yard field goal, 0:29. Raiders 45–20. **Drive: 12 plays, 37 yards, 8:17.**

**Top passers**

- NYJ – Josh McCown – 17/25, 166 yards, 2 TD
- OAK – Derek Carr – 23/28, 230 yards, 3 TD

**Top rushers**

- NYJ – Matt Forte – 9 rushes, 53 yards
- OAK – Jalen Richard – 6 rushes, 58 yards, TD

**Top receivers**

- NYJ – Jermaine Kearse – 4 receptions, 64 yards, 2 TD
- OAK – Michael Crabtree – 6 receptions, 80 yards, 3 TD

**Top tacklers**

- NYJ – Marcus Maye – 7 tackles
- OAK – Reggie Nelson – 8 tackles

The Raiders opened the home portion of their schedule against the New York Jets. After the teams exchanged three-and-outs on their first possessions, the Raiders moved downfield on an 81-yard drive that culminated in a Derek Carr to Michael Crabtree two-yard touchdown pass to give the Raiders an early 7–0 lead. After another Jets punt, the Raiders went 85 yards as Carr hit Crabtree from 26 yards out to extend the lead to 14–0. The Jets answered with a 75-yard drive which ended with a Jermaine Kearse 34-yard pass from Josh McCown for a touchdown, reducing the Raider lead to 14–7. The Raider offense stalled on their next two possessions as the Jets added a 46-yard field goal to narrow the lead to 14–10. With 1:50 remaining in the first half, the Raiders were forced to punt, but Jet returner Kalif Raymond muffed the punt and the Raiders recovered at the Jets four yard line. Three plays later, Oakland native Marshawn Lynch scored from two yards out, his first touchdown as a Raider, to give the Raiders the 21–10 halftime lead.

The Jets began the second half with a field goal that again narrowed the lead, this time to 21–13. The Raiders, however, answered the score convincingly, scoring three touchdowns on their next three possessions as Cordarrelle Patterson and Jalen Richard each scored on long rushing plays and Carr hit Crabtree again from 19 yards out after a Jets fumble to push the lead to 42–13. The Jets added a touchdown midway through the fourth period, but the Raider offense ate up the remaining time on the clock, using 8:17 to go 32 yards before a Georgio Tavecchio 29-yard field goal pushed the lead to 45–20 with 25 seconds remaining. The 45–20 win moved the Raiders to 2–0 on the season, the first time since 2002 that they had started a season 2–0.

Derek Carr completed 23 of 28 passes for 230 yards and three touchdowns, all to Michael Crabtree. Crabtree caught six passes for 80 yards to go along with his three touchdowns. Marshawn Lynch only rushed for 45 yards on 12 carries, but did get a touchdown as the Raiders rushed for 180 yards in the game. The Raider defense played well again limiting the Jets to 276 yards in the game and sacking Jets QB Josh McCown four times.

==== Week 3: at Washington Redskins ====
Week Three: Oakland Raiders at Washington Redskins – Game summary

Quarter	1	2	3	4	Total
Raiders	0	0	7	3	**10**
**Redskins**	7	7	7	6	**27**

at FedExField, Landover, Maryland

- Date: September 24
- Game time: 8:30 p.m. EDT/5:30 p.m. PDT
- Game weather: 76 °F (24 °C), clear
- Game attendance: 77,123
- Referee: Tony Corrente
- TV announcers (NBC): Al Michaels, Cris Collinsworth and Michele Tafoya
- Recap, Gamebook

Game information

**First quarter**

- WAS – Chris Thompson 22-yard pass from Kirk Cousins (Dustin Hopkins kick), 9:43. Redskins 7–0. **Drive: 8 plays, 67 yards, 4:29.**

**Second quarter**

- WAS – Vernon Davis 18-yard pass from Kirk Cousins (Dustin Hopkins kick), 3:48. Redskins 14–0. **Drive: 11 plays, 72 yards, 6:10.**

**Third quarter**

- WAS – Josh Doctson 52-yard pass from Kirk Cousins (Dustin Hopkins kick), 10:37. Redskins 21–0. **Drive: 7 plays, 75 yards, 4:23.**
- Oak – Jared Cook 21-yard pass from Derek Carr (Giorgio Tavecchio kick), 3:52. Redskins 21–7. **Drive: 2 plays, 18 yards, 0:47.**

**Fourth quarter**

- WAS – Dustin Hopkins 23-yard field goal, 14:58. Redskins 24–7. **Drive: 7 plays, 70 yards, 3:54.**
- OAK – Giorgio Tavecchio 22-yard field goal, 11:54. Redskins 24–10. **Drive: 4 plays, 8 yards, 0:22.**
- WAS – Dustin Hopkins 28-yard field goal, 6:02. Redskins 27–10. **Drive: 9 plays, 65 yards, 5:52.**

**Top passers**

- OAK – Derek Carr – 19/31, 118 yards, 1 TD, 2 INT
- WAS – Kirk Cousins 25/30, 365 yards, 3 TD

**Top rushers**

- OAK – Marshawn Lynch – 6 rushes, 18 yards
- WAS – Samaje Perine – 19 rushes, 49 yards

**Top receivers**

- OAK – DeAndré Washington – 5 receptions, 24 yards
- WAS – Chris Thompson – 6 receptions, 150 yards, 1 TD

**Top tacklers**

- OAK – Cory James – 12 tackles
- WAS – Zach Brown – 10 tackles

The Raiders traveled to take on Washington on Sunday Night Football. This was their first appearance on Sunday Night Football since 2006. Beginning a rough night for Derek Carr, on the second play of the game, Carr threw his first interception on the season. Washington took advantage of the turnover, driving 67 yards on eight plays as Kirk Cousins hit Chris Thompson on a 22-yard pass to give Washington the lead 7–0. The teams exchanged punts on each of their next three possessions, but the Raiders turned the ball over again with 10 minutes remaining in the second quarter when Carr was picked off for the second time in the game. Washington again took advantage, driving 72 yards and scoring their second touchdown on a Vernon Davis 18-yard touchdown catch. As a result, the Raiders trailed 14–0 at the half. The Raider offense was completely shut down in the first half, managing only 47 yards from scrimmage.

Washington continued to dominate the Raiders in the second half, driving 75 yards on the opening possession and upping the lead to 21–0 on a Josh Doctson 52-yard touchdown catch. A punt by the Raiders followed and Washington missed a field goal attempt on their next possession as the score remained 21–0. On the Raiders next possession, they were forced to punt, but Jamison Crowder muffed the punt and the Raiders recovered at the Washington 18-yard line. Two plays later, Carr hit Jared Cook from 21 yards out to notch the Raiders first points and cutting the lead to 21–7. A Washington field goal moved the lead to 24–7 as the Raiders were forced to punt again. Following a fumble on the next Washington possession, the Raiders could not get into the end zone from the Washington 20 and were forced to settle for a Giorgio Tavecchio 22-yard field goal. Washington answered the field goal with their own to move the lead back to 17 at 27–10. Neither team could muster anything further as the Raiders fell 27–10. The loss moved the Raiders to 2–1 on the season.

The disappointing performance was led by the Raider offense which went 0–11 on third down tries and managed only 128 total yards. Meanwhile, the Raider defense gave up 472 yards to Washington, 356 through the air.

==== Week 4: at Denver Broncos ====
Week Four: Oakland Raiders at Denver Broncos – Game summary

Quarter	1	2	3	4	Total
Raiders	0	7	0	3	**10**
**Broncos**	10	0	6	0	**16**

at Sports Authority Field at Mile High, Denver, Colorado

- Date: October 1
- Game time: 2:25 p.m. MDT/1:25 p.m. PDT
- Game weather: 72 °F (22 °C), mostly cloudy
- Game attendance: 76,909
- Referee: John Parry
- TV announcers (CBS): Jim Nantz, Tony Romo and Tracy Wolfson
- Recap, Gamebook

Game information

**First quarter**

- DEN – A.J. Derby 22-yard pass from Trevor Siemian (Brandon McManus kick), 8:11. Broncos 7–0. **Drive: 7 plays, 88 yards, 3:17.**
- DEN – Brandon McManus 28-yard field goal, 1:09. Broncos 10–0. Drive: 8 plays, 79 yards, 4:08.

**Second quarter**

- OAK – Johnny Holton 64-yard pass from Derek Carr, (Giorgio Tavecchio kick), 3:36. Broncos 10–7. **Drive: 5 plays, 99 yards, 2:23.**

**Third quarter**

- DEN – Brandon McManus 36-yard field goal, 9:40. Broncos 13–7. Drive: 6 plays, 55 yards, 3:08.
- DEN – Brandon McManus 46-yard field goal, 5:06. Broncos 16–7. Drive: 5 plays, 3 yards, 2:07.

**Fourth quarter**

- OAK – Georgio Tavecchio 38-yard field goal, 5:03. Broncos 16–10. Drive: 9 plays, 73 yards, 3:07.

**Top passers**

- OAK – Derek Carr 10/18, 143 yards, 1 TD
- DEN – Trevor Siemian 16/26, 179 yards, 1 TD

**Top rushers**

- OAK – Marshawn Lynch – 9 rushes, 12 yards
- DEN – C. J. Anderson – 20 rushes, 95 yards

**Top receivers**

- OAK – Johnny Holton – 1 reception, 64 yards, 1 TD
- DEN – A. J. Derby – 4 receptions, 75 yards, 1 TD

**Top tacklers**

- OAK – Cory James – 10 tackles
- DEN – Darian Stewart – 7 tackles

The Raiders next traveled to Denver for their first division game of the year. Once again, the Raider offense struggled, not managing any points until the second quarter. The Denver offense looked good on its second possession of the game, moving 88 yards on seven plays and opening the scoring as Trevor Siemian hit A. J. Derby on a 22-yard pass and catch for a touchdown. Following a quick Raider possession and trailing 7–0, the Raider defense was able to limit Denver to a Brandon McManus 28-yard field goal, stopping the Broncos on the 79-yard drive. Finally, with 5:59 seconds remaining in the second quarter, the Raiders offense came alive. Beginning on their own one-yard line, the Raiders quickly moved out to their 36-yard line before Derek Carr hit Johnny Holton on a bomb for a 64-yard touchdown pass which brought the score to 10–7. The half ended with both offenses managing nothing further.

The Raiders began the second half with the ball, but could not manage a first down again, punting the ball back to the Broncos. Denver capitalized, driving 55 yards before settling for another McManus field goal to move the score to 13–7. A three-and-out by the Raiders on their ensuing possession led to another McManus field goal which extended the Bronco lead to 16–7. Looking to close the gap, the Raiders again failed to manage a first down and attempted a fake punt from inside their own 35-yard line where punter Marquette King attempted to run for the first down, but was instead dropped for a three-yard loss. The Broncos failed to capitalize as McManus missed a 29-yard field goal. Derek Carr was sacked on the first play of the Raiders next possession and had to leave the game with a back injury. Backup quarterback EJ Manuel could not get a first down as the Raiders were forced to punt again with less than three minutes remaining in the third quarter. Neither team managed any points on their first possessors of the fourth quarter. With 8:30 remaining in the game, the Raiders went no huddle and EJ Manuel led the team down the field with five consecutive completions. However, the drive stalled and the Raiders were forced to settled for a Giorgio Tavecchio 38-yard field goal with 5:27 left in the game. The Raider defense forced Denver to punt and Manuel took over with 4:16 left in the game. Completing three of four passes, the Raiders moved to the Denver 41-yard line. However, Manuel's next pass was intercepted by the Broncos at the Denver eight-yard line with 1:46 remaining in the game to end the Raider comeback hopes.

For the second consecutive week, the Raider offense struggled managing only 24 yards rushing while only putting up 249 yard through the air. The Raider defense played well limiting the Broncos to only 298 total yards. The following day, it was announced that Carr had broken a bone in his back (transverse process fracture) and would miss two to six weeks.

==== Week 5: vs. Baltimore Ravens ====
Week Five: Baltimore Ravens at Oakland Raiders – Game summary

Quarter	1	2	3	4	Total
**Ravens**	14	10	0	6	**30**
Raiders	3	7	7	0	**17**

at Oakland–Alameda County Coliseum, Oakland, California

- Date: October 8
- Game time: 1:05 p.m. PDT
- Game weather: 72 °F (22 °C), Sunny
- Game attendance: 54,980
- Referee: Brad Allen
- TV announcers (CBS): Greg Gumbel, Trent Green and Jamie Erdahl
- Recap, Gamebook

Game information

**First quarter**

- BAL – Vince Mayle 2-yard run (Justin Tucker kick), 12:45. Ravens 7–0. **Drive: 5 plays, 75 yards, 2:15.**
- BAL – Jimmy Smith 47-yard fumble return (Justin Tucker kick), 11:10. Ravens 14–0.
- OAK – Giorgio Tavecchio 32-yard field goal, 5:07. Ravens 14–3. **Drive: 12 plays 61, yards, 6:03.**

**Second quarter**

- BAL – Javorius Allen 1-yard run (Justin Tucker kick), 11:57. Ravens 21–3. **Drive: 15 plays, 75 yards, 8:10.**
- OAK – Michael Crabtree 41-yard pass from EJ Manuel (Giorgio Tavecchio kick), 9:11. Ravens 21–10. **Drive: 6 plays, 75 yards, 2:46.**
- BAL – Justin Tucker 22-yard field goal, 5:18. Ravens 24–10. **Drive: 8 plays, 70 yards, 3:53.**

**Third quarter**

- OAK – Marshawn Lynch 3-yard run (Giorgio Tavecchio kick), 3:46. Ravens 24–17. **Drive: 12 plays, 65 yards, 4:42.**

**Fourth quarter**

- BAL – Justin Tucker 21 yard field goal, 13:10. Ravens 27–17. **Drive: 12 plays 72 yards, 5:36.**
- BAL – Justin Tucker 44 yard field goal, 2:24. Ravens 30–17. **Drive: 13 plays, 54 yards, 6:26.**

**Top passers**

- BAL – Joe Flacco 19/26, 222 yards
- OAK – EJ Manuel 13/26, 159 yards, 1 TD

**Top rushers**

- BAL – Javorius Allen 21 rushes, 73 yards, 1 TD
- OAK – Marshawn Lynch 12 rushes, 43 yards, 1 TD

**Top receivers**

- BAL – Mike Wallace 3 receptions, 133 yards
- OAK – Michael Crabtree 6 reception, 82 yards, 1 TD

**Top tacklers**

- BAL – Eric Weddle 7 tackles
- OAK – Karl Joseph 9 tackles

After playing three of their first four games on the road, the Raiders returned home for the first of three straight home games against Baltimore. Without Derek Carr due to a fracture in his back, EJ Manuel started for the Raiders. The Raiders defense again struggled, giving up 365 total yards, 222 through the air. Joe Flacco and Mike Wallace torched the Raider secondary, connecting on three passes of more than 20 yards. A 52-yard pass from Flacco to Wallace set up the first Raven touchdown on their first possession. Trailing 7–0, Raider tight end Jared Cook fumbled on the ensuing possession and Jimmy Smith returned the fumble 47 yards to put the Raiders in 14–0 hole with over 11 minutes remaining in the first quarter. The Raiders marched 61 yards on 12 plays on their next possession, but had to settle for a Giorgio Tavecchio 32-yard field goal. The Ravens extended the lead on their next possession, going 75 yards on 15 plays before Javorius Allen plunged in from one yard out to extend the lead to 21–3 early in the second quarter. EJ Manuel would find Michael Crabtree on a 41-yard touchdown pass following a scramble, but the Ravens added a field goal before the half to move the score to 24–10.

In the second half, the Raiders pulled within a touchdown following a Marshawn Lynch three-yard score. However, the Raider offense could muster no more as EJ Manuel was sacked three times in the game and was under constant pressure from the Ravens. Two more field goals by the Ravens extended the lead to 30–17 with just over two minutes remaining and sealed the Raiders' third straight loss on the season.

==== Week 6: vs. Los Angeles Chargers ====
Week Six: Los Angeles Chargers at Oakland Raiders – Game summary

Quarter	1	2	3	4	Total
**Chargers**	0	7	0	10	**17**
Raiders	7	3	0	6	**16**

at Oakland–Alameda County Coliseum, Oakland, California

- Date: October 15
- Game time: 1:25 p.m. PDT
- Game weather: 76 °F (24 °C), sunny
- Game attendance: 54,685
- Referee: Clete Blakeman
- TV announcers (CBS): Kevin Harlan and Rich Gannon
- Recap, Gamebook

Game information

**First quarter**

- OAK – Michael Crabtree 23-yard pass from Derek Carr, (Giorgio Tavecchio kick), 5:04. Raiders 7–0. **Drive: 11 plays, 62 yards, 6:05.**

**Second quarter**

- SD – Melvin Gordon 1-yard run (Nick Novak kick), 1:44. Tied 7–7. **Drive: 15 plays, 82 yards, 6:41.**
- OAK – Giorgio Tavecchio 44-yard field goal, 0:00. Raiders 10–7. **Drive: 7 plays, 34 yards, 1:44.**

**Third quarter** **Fourth quarter**

- SD – Melvin Gordon 6-yard pass from Philip Rivers, (Nick Novak kick), 10:19. Chargers 14–10. **Drive: 10 plays, 59 yards, 4:38.**
- OAK – Cordarrelle Patterson 47 yard run (kick failed), 7:51. Raiders 16–14. **Drive: 4 plays, 65 yards, 2:28.**
- SD – Nick Novak 32-yard field goal, 0:00. Chargers 17–16. **Drive: 11 plays, 78 yards, 4:09.**

**Top passers**

- LAC – Philip Rivers 25/36, 268 yards, 1 TD
- OAK – Derek Carr 21/30, 171 yards, 1 TD, 2 INT

**Top rushers**

- LAC – Melvin Gordon 25 rushes, 63 yards, 1 TD
- OAK – Marshawn Lynch 13 rushes, 63 yards

**Top receivers**

- LAC – Hunter Henry 5 receptions, 90 yards
- OAK – Michael Crabtree 5 receptions, 52 yards

**Top tacklers**

- LAC – Hayes Pullard 10 tackles
- OAK – T. J. Carrie 8 tackles

Looking to stop a three-game losing streak, the Raiders welcomed Derek Carr back after missing one week due to injury to face the Los Angeles Chargers. However, things did not start well for Carr as he threw an interception on his first pass of the day and the Chargers took over at the Raider 30-yard line. the defense held the Chargers to a field goal attempt from 48 yards out which was no good. The Raiders took advantage and moved the ball down the field before Carr hit Michael Crabtree from 23 yards out to give the Raiders a 7–0 lead. Neither team could muster much offense until midway through the second quarter when the Chargers moved 82 yards and scored on a Melvin Gordon touchdown run from one yard out to tie the game. With, 1:34 remaining in the half, the Raiders moved into Charger territory and connected on a Giorgio Tavecchio 44-yard field goal as time expired to give the Raiders a 10–7 lead at the half.

On their first possession of the second half, the Raiders moved deep into Charger territory, but managed no points as Carr was intercepted for the second time in the game. The teams exchanged punts and fumbles as the game moved into the fourth quarter. The Chargers finally managed some offense as Philip Rivers hit Melvin Gordon for a six-yard touchdown pass to give the Charger at 14–10 lead. On their ensuing possession, Cordarrelle Patterson took the ball on an end around and scampered 47 yards for a touchdown. Giorgio Tavecchio would, however, miss the ensuing point after to leave the Raider lead at two points, 16–14. After exchanging punts, the Chargers took over with 4:09 remaining in the game. Rivers hit Hunter Henry for a 23-yard pass play to move the ball into Raider territory. with less than two minutes remaining, the Chargers moved the ball to the Raider 10 yard line and lined up for the game-winning field goal with three second left in the game. The field goal was good and the Raiders suffered their fourth straight loss, falling to 2–4 on the season. The four losses through six games equaled the number of losses they suffered the entire season the prior year.

The Raider defense again struggled, giving up 343 total yards while the offense struggled as well, managing only 274 yards. Carr's two interceptions proved costly in his return. After the game, the team said his poor play was not due to his injury.

==== Week 7: vs. Kansas City Chiefs ====
Week Seven: Kansas City Chiefs at Oakland Raiders – Game summary

Quarter	1	2	3	4	Total
Chiefs	10	10	10	0	**30**
**Raiders**	14	0	7	10	**31**

at Oakland–Alameda County Coliseum, Oakland, California

- Date: October 19
- Game time: 5:26 p.m. PDT
- Game weather: 62 °F (17 °C), mostly cloudy
- Game attendance: 55,090
- Referee: Craig Wrolstad
- TV announcers (CBS/NFLN/Amazon Video): Jim Nantz, Tony Romo, Tracy Wolfson and Jay Feely
- Recap, Gamebook

Game information

**First quarter**

- KC – Harrison Butker 53-yard field goal. 10:14. Chiefs 3–0. **Drive: 10 plays, 40 yards, 4:46.**
- OAK – Amari Cooper 38-yard pass from Derek Carr, (Giorgio Tavecchio kick), 8:11. Raiders 7–3. **Drive: 4 plays, 75 yards, 2:03.**
- KC – Travis Kelce 10-yard pass from Alex Smith, (Harrison Butker kick), 7:17. Chiefs 10–7. **Drive: 7 plays, 82 yards, 3:54.**
- OAK – Amari Cooper 45-yard pass from Derk Carr, (Giorgio Tavecchio kick), 0:40. Raiders 14–10. **Drive: 8 plays, 75 yards, 3:54.**

**Second quarter**

- KC – Tyreek Hill 64-yard pass from Alex Smith, (Harrison Butker kick), 8:51. Chiefs 17–14. **Drive: 3 plays, 99 yards, 1:32.**
- KC – Harrison Butker 39-yard field goal, 1:06. Chiefs 20–14. **Drive: 10 plays, 26 yards, 3:45.**

**Third quarter**

- OAK – DeAndré Washington 4-yard run, (Giorgio Tavecchio kick), 10:41. Raiders 21–20. **Drive: 8 plays, 85 yards, 4:15.**
- KC – Albert Wilson 63-yard pass from Alex Smith, (Harrison Butker kick), 7:08. Chiefs 27–21. **Drive: 6 plays, 75 yards, 3:37.**
- KC – Harrison Butker 37-yard field goal, 0:47. Chiefs 30–21. **Drive: 11 plays, 55 yards, 4:15.**

**Fourth quarter**

- OAK – Giorgio Tavecchio 26-yard field goal, 11:53. Chiefs 30–24. **Drive: 12 plays, 67 yards, 3:54.**
- OAK – Michael Crabtree 2-yard pass from Derek Carr, (Giorgio Tevecchio kick), 0:00. Raiders 31–30. **Drive: 11 plays, 85 yards, 2:25.**

**Top passers**

- KC – Alex Smith 25/36, 342 yards, 3 TD
- OAK – Derek Carr 29/52, 417 yards, 3 TD

**Top rushers**

- KC – Kareem Hunt 18 rushes, 87 yards
- OAK – DeAndré Washington 9 rushes, 33 yards, 1 TD

**Top receivers**

- KC – Tyreek Hill 6 receptions, 125 yards, 1 TD
- OAK – Amari Cooper 11 receptions, 210 yards, 2 TD

**Top tacklers**

- KC – Daniel Sorensen 9 tackles
- OAK – NaVorro Bowman 11 tackes

The Raiders welcomed division-leader Kansas City to Oakland on Thursday Night Football. The Raiders were looking to break their four-game losing streak with Derek Carr making his second straight start after injuring his back.

The Chiefs scored on their first possession as the Raider defense held them to a 53-yard field goal by Harrison Butker. The Raider offense, which had struggled mightily in the prior four games, got on the board early as Derek Carr hit Amari Cooper from 38 yards out on a flea flicker to give the Raiders a 7–3 lead. The Chiefs immediately retook the lead on their next possession as Alex Smith found Travis Kelce for a 10-yard touchdown. Carr found Cooper again on the Raiders next possession, this time from 45 yards out for a touchdown and a 14–10 lead with 40 seconds remaining in the first quarter. As the second quarter began, each team exchanged punts before Smith hit Tyreke Hill on a 64-yard catch and run to give the Chiefs a 17–14 lead. The Raiders attempted to tie the game on their next possession, but Giorgio Tevecchio's 53-yard field goal was blocked. Prior to the field goal attempt, Marshawn Lynch was ejected from the game for contacting an official after he ran on to the field during an altercation after a Carr rush. A Butker field goal with just over a minute remaining in the first half extended the Chief lead to 20–14. Tavecchio again missed a field goal, this time from 45 yards out, as time expired in the first half.

In the second half, the Raider offense continued to perform well, driving 85 yards on eight plays and converting on a DeAndré Washington four-yard run to give the Raiders the 21–20 lead. The back-and-forth offensive show continued as the Chiefs retook the lead on their next possession as Albert Wilson scored from 63 yards out on a Smith pass to give the Chiefs the lead once again. Following a Raider punt, the Chiefs extend the lead on a Butker field goal with less than a minute left in the third quarter. Trailing 30–21 in the fourth and on the verge of their fifth consecutive loss, the Raiders drove to the Chief eight-yard line before settling for a Tevecchio 26-yard field goal to narrow the lead to six. Each team punted on their next possession and the Raider defense kept them in the game by stopping the Chiefs on three plays with less than four minutes remaining in the game. The Raiders took over with 2:25 remaining and moved down the field, converting a fourth and 11 at the Chief 42 on a Jared Cook 13-yard completion with 41 seconds remaining. Three plays later, Carr hit Cook again from 29 yards out for a game-tying touchdown. However, after review, it was determined that Cook was down inside the one-yard line. With seven seconds remaining, Carr hit Michael Crabtree for another game-tying touchdown. However, Crabtree was called for pass interference on the play. With three seconds remaining Carr's pass to Cook was incomplete as time expired. This time, the Chiefs were called for holding and the Raiders were awarded an untimed down. Carr's next pass again fell incomplete, but again the Chiefs were called for holding. With another untimed down, Carr hit Crabtree in the front corner of the endzone to tie the game at 30. After a review confirmed the touchdown, Tavecchio, who had missed an extra point the previous week which ended up being the difference in the game, easily made the extra point to win the game for the Raiders. The 31–30 win moved the Raiders to 3–4 on the season and ended their four-game losing streak.

Derek Carr had a season-high 417 yards passing and threw three touchdown passes. Amari Cooper, who had struggled mightily on the season, caught 11 passes for 210 yards and two touchdowns in the win.

==== Week 8: at Buffalo Bills ====
Week Eight: Oakland Raiders at Buffalo Bills – Game summary

Quarter	1	2	3	4	Total
Raiders	7	0	0	7	**14**
**Bills**	0	14	6	14	**34**

at New Era Field, Orchard Park, New York

- Date: October 29
- Game time: 1:00 p.m. EDT/10:00 a.m. PDT
- Game weather: 42 °F (6 °C), rain
- Game attendance: 69,599
- Referee: Ed Hochuli
- TV announcers (CBS): Andrew Catalon and James Lofton
- Recap, Gamebook

Game information

**First quarter**

- OAK – Jamize Olawale 1-yard run (Giorgio Tavecchio kick), 9:28. Raiders 7–0. **Drive: 13 plays 81 yards, 5:32.**

**Second quarter**

- BUF – Andre Holmes 6-yard pass from Tyrod Taylor (Stephen Hauschka kick), 8:46. Tie 7–7. **Drive: 9 plays, 64 yards, 4:40.**
- BUF – Matt Milano 40-yard fumble return (Stephen Hauschka kick), 0:32. Bills 14–7.

**Third quarter**

- BUF – Stephen Hauschka 35-yard field goal, 11:44. Bills 17–7. **Drive: 4 plays, 3 yards, 1:22.**
- BUF – Stephen Hauschka 44-yard field goal, 8:18. Bills 20–7. **Drive: 6 plays, 15 yards, 2:23.**

**Fourth quarter**

- BUF – Tyrod Taylor 1-yard run (Stephen Hauschka kick), 14:57. Bills 27–7. **Drive: 12 plays, 80 yards, 7:19.**
- OAK – DeAndré Washington 4-yard pass from Derek Carr (Giorgio Tavecchio kick), 10:50. Bills 27–14. **Drive: 9 plays, 75 yards, 4:07.**
- BUF – LeSean McCoy 48-yard run (Stephen Hauschka kick), 3:12. Bills 34–14. **Drive: 1 play 48 yards, 0:09.**

**Top passers**

- OAK – Derek Carr 31/49, 313 yards, 1 TD, 2 INT
- BUF – Tyrod Taylor 20/27, 165 yards, 1 TD

**Top rushers**

- OAK – DeAndré Washington 6 rushes, 26 yards
- BUF – LeSean McCoy 27 rushes, 151 yards, 1 TD

**Top receivers**

- OAK – Michael Crabtree 5 receptions, 83 yards
- BUF – Andre Holmes 3 receptions, 51 yards, 1 TD

**Top tacklers**

- OAK – NaVorro Bowman 11 tackles
- BUF – Trae Elston 11 tackles

Traveling to Buffalo to face the Bills, the Raiders were without running back Marshawn Lynch, who was suspended for one game after making contact with an official during the team's win against Kansas City the week before. Hoping to build on the victory over the Chiefs, the Raiders started well driving 81 yards as Jamize Olawale scored from one yard out to give Oakland a 7–0 lead. However, the Raider offense sputtered on their next two possession and were forced to punt. After Tyrod Taylor hit former Raider Andre Holmes for six-yard touchdown pass to tie the game, the Raiders took over with just over two minutes remaining in the first half. Derek Carr hit DeAndré Washington over the middle over a five-yard gain, but was hit by Leonard Johnson and fumbled the ball which was recovered by Matt Milano and returned for a 40-yard touchdown to give the Bills a 14–7 lead at the half.

The Bills increased the lead on their first possession of the third quarter with a 35-yard field goal. Carr was intercepted on the next Raider possession and the Bills added another field goal to push the lead to 20–7 with more than 10 minutes left in the third quarter. The Raider offense continued to struggle and punted on their next possession. The Bills took advantage and moved 80 yards in a 7:19 drive before Taylor snuck the ball in from inside the one-yard line on the first play of the fourth quarter to move the Buffalo lead to 27–7. The Raider offense finally came to life on their next possession, going no-huddle and moving 75 yards on nine plays before Carr hit Washington from four yards out to the narrow the lead to 27–14. After forcing a Buffalo punt, the Raider offense stalled near midfield and turned the ball over on downs. Looking to take some time off the clock, the Bills instead put the game out of reach as LeSean McCoy scored on a 48-yard run on the first play of the drive to move the lead to 34–14. The Raiders were able to move into Buffalo territory with under two minutes remaining, but Carr was intercepted as the Bills were able to run out the clock. The loss moved the Raider to 3–5 on the season. The fifth loss on the season, in Week 8, surpassed the number of losses (four) the Raiders suffered in the entire season the previous year.

The Raider defense struggled once again, giving up 166 yards on the ground to the Bills, but did limit the Bills to 165 yards through the air. Carr completed 31 of 49 passes for 313 yards, but his two interceptions and two fumbles by the Raiders were their undoing.

==== Week 9: at Miami Dolphins ====
Week Nine: Oakland Raiders at Miami Dolphins – Game summary

Quarter	1	2	3	4	Total
**Raiders**	3	10	7	7	**27**
Dolphins	0	9	7	8	**24**

at Hard Rock Stadium, Miami Gardens, Florida

- Date: November 5
- Game time: 8:30 p.m. EST/5:30 p.m. PST
- Game weather: 77 °F (25 °C)
- Game attendance: 65,139
- Referee: Terry McAulay
- TV announcers (NBC): Al Michaels, Cris Collinsworth and Michele Tafoya
- Recap, Gamebook

Game information

**First quarter**

- OAK – Giorgio Tavecchio 36-yard field goal, 7:31. Raiders 3–0. **Drive: 12 plays, 58 yards, 7:29.**

**Second quarter**

- MIA – Damien Williams 10-yard pass from Jay Cutler (kick failed), 10:37. Dolphins 6–3. **Drive: 10 plays, 82 yards, 5:35.**
- OAK – Johnny Holton 44- yard pass from Derek Carr (Giorgio Tavecchio kick), 3:26. Raiders 10–6. **Drive: 6 plays, 81 yards, 4:02.**
- MIA – Cody Parkey 49-yard field goal, 0:32. Raiders 10–9. **Drive: 8 plays, 49 yards, 2:54.**
- OAK – Giorgio Tavecchio 53-yard field goal, 0:00. Raiders 13–9. **Drive: 5 plays, 42 yards, 0:32.**

**Third quarter**

- OAK – Marshawn Lynch 22-yard run (Giorgio Tavecchio kick), 9:23. Raiders 20–9. **Drive: 6 plays, 67 yards, 3:24.**
- MIA – Jarvis Landry 6-yard pass from Jay Cutler (Cody Parkey kick), 6:34. Raiders 20–16. **Drive: 7 plays, 75 yards, 2:49.**

**Fourth quarter**

- OAK – Marshawn Lynch 3-yard run (Giorgio Tavecchio kick), 4:37. Raiders 27–16. **Drive:6 plays, 87 yards, 2:44.**
- MIA – Julius Thomas 15-yard pass from Jay Cutler (Kenyan Drake run), 1:32. Raiders 27–24. **Drive: 5 plays, 83 yards, 0:22.**

**Top passers**

- OAK – Derek Carr 21/30, 300 yards, 1 TD, 1 INT
- MIA – Jay Cutler 34/42, 311 yards, 3 TD

**Top rushers**

- OAK – Marshawn Lynch 14 rushes, 57 yards, 2 TD
- MIA – Kenyan Drake 9 rushes, 69 yards

**Top receivers**

- OAK – Jared Cook 8 receptions, 126 yards
- MIA – Julius Thomas 6 receptions, 84 yards, 1 TD

**Top tacklers**

- OAK – NaVorro Bowman, Dexter McDonald 10 tackles
- MIA – Reshad Jones 9 tackles

The Raiders stayed on the East Coast following the loss to the Bills to take on the Miami Dolphins on Sunday Night Football. Once again, the Raiders started well, driving 58 yards on 12 plays before stalling and settling for a field goal for an early 3–0 lead. Following punts by both team, the Dolphins pass offense carved up the Raiders dinged-up secondary, going 82 yards on 10 play as Jay Cutler hit Damien Williams for a 10-yard touchdown. The extra point hit the upright and the Dolphins led 6–3. The Dolphins attempted an onside kick on the ensuing kickoff which they recovered. Four plays later, inside the Raider 25 yard line, Kenyan Drake fumbled the ball to end the Dolphins' drive. The Raiders quickly answered as Derek Carr hit speedster Johnny Holton on a 44-yard bomb to the end zone to give the Raiders a 10–6 lead with just over three minutes remaining in the half. The Dolphins moved quickly down the field, but were stopped at the Raider 31 and settled for a field goal to reduce the lead to one point. With just over 30 seconds remaining, The Raider offense moved 42 yards on five plays to set up Giorgio Tavecchio's 53-yard field goal as time expired. At the half, the Raiders led 13–9.

In the second half, the Raiders forced the Dolphins to punt on their first possession and the Raider offense took over. Moving 67 yards on six plays, Marshawn Lynch capped the drive with a 22-yard touchdown run to push the Raider lead to 20–9. Miami would not give in, answering on their next drive as Cutler hit Jarvis Landry for a six-yard scored to cut the lead to four again. The teams' defenses took over as they each forced a fumble before Ndamukong Suh forced a Carr fumble to give the Dolphins the ball near midfield. However, the Raider defense forced another punt. Following punts from both teams, Oakland took over at their own 13 with 7:21 left in the game. Six plays later, Lynch bowled his way into the end zone from three yards out to appear to put the game away at 27–16 with four and a half minutes remaining. Miami would turn the ball over on downs at midfield with under three minutes remaining as the game again appeared to be over. However, Carr was intercepted on third down and the Phins moved down the field, moving 83 yards and scoring on a 15-yard pass from Cutler to Julius Thomas with 1:32 remaining. The two-point conversion was good as the lead was narrowed to 27–24. Miami's onside kick was recovered by Amari Cooper and the Raiders were able to kneel out the clock for the 27–24 win.

Carr threw for 300 yards with a touchdown and interception. Marshawn Lynch scored twice and Jared Cook had a big day with eight receptions for 126 yards. The Raiders were out-gained 395–379 as both teams had over 100 yards in penalties in the sloppy game. The win moved the Raiders to 4–5 on the season heading into their bye week.

==== Week 11: vs. New England Patriots ====
NFL International Series

Week Eleven: New England Patriots at Oakland Raiders – Game summary

Quarter	1	2	3	4	Total
**Patriots**	7	10	13	3	**33**
Raiders	0	0	0	8	**8**

at Estadio Azteca, Mexico City, Mexico

- Date: November 19
- Game time: 3:25 p.m. CST/1:25 p.m. PST
- Game weather: 66 °F (19 °C), sunny
- Game attendance: 77,357
- Referee: John Hussey
- TV announcers (CBS): Jim Nantz, Tony Romo and Tracy Wolfson
- Recap, Gamebook

Game information

**First quarter**

- NE – Dion Lewis 15-yard pass from Tom Brady (Stephen Gostkowski kick), 4:09. Patriots 7–0. **Drive: 15 plays, 87 yards, 7:07.**

**Second quarter**

- NE – Danny Amendola 5-yard pass from Tom Brady (Stephen Gostkowski kick), 5:23. Patriots 14–0. **Drive: 9 plays, 80 yards, 3:32.**
- NE – Stephen Gostkowski 62-yard field goal, 0:00. Patriots 17–0. **Drive: 5 plays, 48 yards, 0:33.**

**Third quarter**

- NE – Brandin Cooks 64-yard pass from Tom Brady (Stephen Gostkowski kick), 14:06. Patriots 24–0. **Drive: 3 plays, 75 yards, 0:54.**
- NE – Stephen Gostkowski 51-yard field goal, 7:04. Patriots 27–0. **Drive: 8 plays, 47 yards, 3:57.**
- NE – Stephen Gostkowski 40-yard field goal, 2:03. Patriots 30–0. **Drive: 5 plays, 22 yards, 2:36.**

**Fourth quarter**

- OAK – Amari Cooper 9-yard pass from Derek Carr (Derek Carr-Michael Crabtree pass), 11:43. Patriots 30–8. **Drive: 13 plays, 75 yards, 5:20.**
- NE – Stephen Gostkowski 29-yard field goal, 8:15. Patriots 33–8. **Drive: 8 plays, 59 yards, 3:28.**

**Top passers**

- NE – Tom Brady – 30/37, 339 yards, 3 TD
- OAK – Derek Carr – 28/49, 237 yards, TD, INT

**Top rushers**

- NE – Dion Lewis – 10 rushes, 60 yards
- OAK – Marshawn Lynch – 11 rushes, 67 yards

**Top receivers**

- NE – Brandin Cooks – 6 receptions, 149 yards, TD
- OAK – Michael Crabtree – 6 receptions, 51 yards

**Top tacklers**

- NE – Patrick Chung – 8 tackles, 1 assist
- OAK – Cory James, Karl Joseph – 6 tackles, 1 assist

Following their bye week, the Raiders traveled to Mexico City for a home game against the AFC-leading Patriots, in a rematch of the Tuck Rule Game. With a loss by the Chiefs earlier in the day, the Raiders looked to move within one game of the division lead. The Patriots quickly shut out any hope of a win, scoring touchdowns on two of their first three possessions to take a 14–0 lead. With under two minutes remaining in the half, the Raiders drove inside the New England 20 yard line in an attempt to cut the lead in half. Derek Carr hit Seth Roberts at the New England three, but Roberts did not properly secure the ball and fumbled, turning the ball over to Tom Brady and the Patriots with 33 seconds remaining in the half. New England quickly moved to the Raider 45 and Stephen Gostkowski connected on a 62-yard field goal as the half ended to move the lead to 17–0.

In the second half, things got even worse for the Raiders as the Patriots scored on their third play, a Brady 64-yard pass to Brandin Cooks to extend the lead to 24 and end any hope of a Raider win. Two more Gostkowski field goals in the third quarter moved the lead to 30–0 entering the fourth quarter. Carr did hit Amari Cooper from nine yards out and converted the two-point play early in the fourth quarter. Another Gostkowski field goal ended the scoring as the Patriots dismantled the Raiders 33–8.

The loss moved the Raiders to 4–6 on the season as they remained two games behind the Chiefs in the AFC West. The Raiders were out-gained 420–344 on the day as the Raiders' defense continued its season-long struggle.

==== Week 12: vs. Denver Broncos ====
Week Twelve: Denver Broncos at Oakland Raiders – Game summary

Quarter	1	2	3	4	Total
Broncos	0	0	0	14	**14**
**Raiders**	0	14	7	0	**21**

at Oakland–Alameda County Coliseum, Oakland, California

- Date: November 26
- Game time: 1:25 p.m. PST
- Game weather: 61 °F (16 °C), cloudy
- Game attendance: 54,994
- Referee: Walt Anderson
- TV announcers (CBS): Kevin Harlan and Rich Gannon
- Recap, Gamebook

Game information

**First quarter**

- No scoring plays.

**Second quarter**

- OAK – Amari Cooper 9-yard pass from Derek Carr (Giorgio Tavecchio kick), 8:47. Raiders 7–0. **Drive: 8 plays, 80 yards, 5:21.**
- OAK – Marshawn Lynch 1-yard run (Giorgio Tavecchio kick), 2:53. Raiders 14–0. **Drive: 8 plays, 52 yards, 4:00.**

**Third quarter**

- OAK – Jalen Richard 6-yard pass from Derek Carr (Giorgio Tavecchio kick), 6:27. Raiders 21–0. **Drive: 7 plays, 66 yards, 4:46.**

**Fourth quarter**

- DEN – Cody Latimer 25-yard pass from Trevor Siemian (Brandon McManus kick), 10:26. Raiders 21–7. **Drive: 10 plays, 93 yards, 3:48.**
- DEN – Bennie Fowler 22-yard pass from Trevor Siemian (Brandon McManus kick), 2:44. Raiders 21–14. **Drive: 12 plays, 75 yards, 3:07.**

**Top passers**

- DEN – Trevor Siemian – 11/21, 149 yards, 2 TD
- OAK – Derek Carr – 18/24, 253 yards, 2 TD

**Top rushers**

- DEN – Paxton Lynch – 2 rushes, 20 yards
- OAK – Marshawn Lynch – 26 rushes, 67 yards, TD

**Top receivers**

- DEN – Cody Latimer – 3 receptions, 48 yards, TD
- OAK – Cordarrelle Patterson – 3 receptions, 72 yards

**Top tacklers**

- DEN – Todd Davis – 8 tackles
- OAK – NaVorro Bowman – 7 tackles

Looking to stay in the division race, the Raiders returned to Oakland to take on a struggling Denver team. With a loss earlier in the day by the Chiefs, the Raiders controlled their own destiny to win the division. Following three-and-outs for each team on their first possession, a fight broke out between the teams as Denver cornerback Aqib Talib and Raider receiver Michael Crabtree threw punches at each other and were ejected from the game. Raider offensive lineman Gabe Jackson was also ejected for fighting. After the fight, both offenses struggled for the remainder of the first quarter. On the Raiders first possession of the second quarter, following the team's first interception on the year, the offense went 80 yards on eight plays capped off by a Derek Carr to Amari Cooper nine-yard touchdown pass to give the Raiders the 7–0 lead. The Raiders scored again on their next possession as Marshawn Lynch scored from one yard out to extend the lead to 14–0 as the first half came to a close.

In the second half, the Raider offense continued its good play scoring on a 66-yard drive when Carr hit Jalen Richard for six-yard touchdown and a 21–0 lead. Shortly thereafter, Bronco starting quarterback Paxton Lynch was replaced by Trevor Siemian, but the Raider defense continued to keep the Broncos in check as the third quarter ended. Denver's offense managed a touchdown with four minutes in to the fourth quarter to narrow the lead to 21–7. The Raiders were turned away on their next possession and came away with no points as Giorgio Tavecchio missed a 35-yard field goal. Siemian led the Broncos on a 12 play, 12 minute, 75-yard drive, hitting Bennie Fowler on a 22-yard pass to bring the Broncos within seven with 2:44 remaining in the game. The Broncos chose to not attempt an onside kick and Carr made them pay, hitting Cordarrelle Patterson on a 54-yard pass to allow the Raiders to run out the clock and secure the 21–14 win.

The win moved the Raiders to 5–6 on the season and put them within one game of the Chiefs for the division lead. The Raiders, who had fired defensive coordinator Ken Norton Jr. earlier in the week, out-gained the Broncos 348–219 in the game. The Raider defense also intercepted a pass for the first time on the season as NaVorro Bowman intercepted a Lynch pass early in the second half to set up the Raiders first score of the game. Amari Cooper was forced to leave the game in the second quarter with a suspected concussion.

==== Week 13: vs. New York Giants ====
Week Thirteen: New York Giants at Oakland Raiders – Game summary

Quarter	1	2	3	4	Total
Giants	7	0	0	10	**17**
**Raiders**	7	3	0	14	**24**

at Oakland–Alameda County Coliseum, Oakland, California

- Date: December 3
- Game time: 1:25 p.m. PST
- Game weather: 58 °F (14 °C), sunny
- Game attendance: 54,994
- Referee: Pete Morelli
- TV announcers (Fox): Kenny Albert, Ronde Barber and Kristina Pink
- Recap, Gamebook

Game information

**First quarter**

- OAK – Marshawn Lynch 51-yard run (Giorgio Tavecchio kick), 12:26. OAK 7–00. **Drive: 3 plays, 60 yards, 1:31.**
- NYG – Orleans Darkwa 1-yard run (Aldrick Rosas kick), 0:06. Tie 7–7. **Drive: 11 plays, 74 yards, 5:16.**

**Second quarter**

- OAK – Giorgio Tavecchio 39-yard field goal, 3:37. OAK 10–7. **Drive: 12 plays 47 yards, 5:16.**

**Third quarter**

- No scoring plays.

**Fourth quarter**

- OAK – DeAndré Washington 9-yard run (Giorgio Tavecchio kick), 10:18. **OAK 17–7. Drive: 8 plays, 79 yards, 4:42.**
- NJG – Evan Engram 10-yard pass from Geno Smith (Aldrick Rosas kick), 5:16. OAK 17–14. **Drive: 9 plays 88 yards, 5:02.**
- OAK – Johnny Holton 9-yard pass from Derek Carr (Giorgio Tavecchio kick), 3:23. OAK 24–14. **Drive: 4 plays, 68 yards, 1:53.**
- NYG – Aldrick Rosas 52-yard field goal, 1:38. OAK 24–17. **Drive: 9 plays, 46 yards, 1:45.**

**Top passers**

- NYG – Geno Smith 21/34, 212 yards, 1 TD
- OAK – Derek Carr 22/36, 287 yards, 1 TD

**Top rushers**

- NYG – Orleans Darkwa 14 rushes, 32 yards, 1 TD
- OAK – Marshawn Lynch 17 rushes, 101 yards, 1 TD

**Top receivers**

- NYG – Evan Engram 7 receptions, 99 yards, 1 TD
- OAK – Cordarrelle Patterson 4 receptions, 97 yards

**Top tacklers**

- NYG – Kelvin Sheppard 8 tackles
- OAK – NaVorro Bowman, Nicholas Morrow 9 tackles

With a Chiefs loss earlier in the day, the Raiders welcomed the struggling New York Giants to Oakland with Eli Manning being benched in favor of Geno Smith. A win would mean that the Raiders, who already controlled their own destiny, would be tied for first place in the AFC West with the Chiefs.

After holding the Giants to three plays and out on their first drive, Marshawn Lynch rushed for 60 yards on three attempts including a 51-yard rush for a touchdown to put the Raiders up early 7–0. both offenses sputtered for the remainder of the first quarter, before the Giants tied the game on a one-yard run by Orleans Darkwa near the end of the quarter. The Raiders would retake the lead in the second quarter on a Giorgio Tavecchio 39-yard field goal. The Raider defense played well in the first half, limiting the Giants to only 16 yards rushing in the half.

In the third quarter, both offenses continued to struggle, but the Raiders began to over the ball with just over four minutes left in the quarter. However, a Johnny Holton fumble ended the drive. However, the Raiders were able to capitalize in the fourth when DeAndré Washington scored from nine yards out to give the Raiders a 17–7 lead with 10 minutes to play. The Giants immediately answered as Geno Smith hit Evan Engram for a 10-yard touchdown pass to pull within three again with under six minutes remaining. The Raiders quickly answered as Derek Carr hit Cordarrelle Patterson on a 49-yard catch and run to give the Raiders the ball at the Giants nine yard line. Two plays later, Carr hit Holdon, who again fumbled as he crossed the goal line. However, the play was ruled a touchdown and the Raiders moved their lead to 24–14 with three minutes left in the game. The Raider defense allowed the Giants to move into Oakland territory, but forced a 52-yard field goal. On the ensuing onside kick, the Raiders recovered and were able to run out the clock.

Derek Carr threw for 287 yards in the 24–17 victory as the Raider defense limited the Giants to 265 net yards. Khalil Mack and Bruce Irvin each forced Geno Smith to fumble in the game to stop potential Giant scoring drives. The win moved the Raiders to 6–6 on the season and into a first-place tie with the Chiefs and Chargers who had also won.

==== Week 14: at Kansas City Chiefs ====
Week Fourteen: Oakland Raiders at Kansas City Chiefs – Game summary

Quarter	1	2	3	4	Total
Raiders	0	0	0	15	**15**
**Chiefs**	3	13	10	0	**26**

at Arrowhead Stadium, Kansas City, Missouri

- Date: December 10
- Game time: 12:00 p.m. CST/10:00 a.m. PST
- Game weather: 46 °F (8 °C), sunny
- Game attendance: 74,461
- Referee: Carl Cheffers
- TV announcers (CBS): Kevin Harlan, Rich Gannon and Jenny Dell
- Recap, Gamebook

Game information

**First quarter**

- KC – Harrison Butker 53-yard field goal, 9:22. Chiefs 3–0. **Drive: 8 plays, 23 yards, 4:07.**

**Second quarter**

- KC – Kareem Hunt 1-yard run (Harrison Butker kick), 14:57. Chiefs 10–0. **Drive: 14 plays, 86 yards, 7:03.**
- KC – Harrison Butker 29-yard field goal, 10:48. Chiefs 13–0. **Drive: 7 plays, 52 yards, 2:31.**
- KC – Harrison Butker 33-yard field goal, 1:41. Chiefs 16–0. **Drive: 9 plays, 61 yards, 4:51.**

**Third quarter**

- KC – Harrison Butker 40-yard field goal, 11:01. Chiefs 19–0. **Drive: 9 plays, 53 yards, 3:59.**
- KC – Charcandrick West 13-yard run (Harrison Butker kick), 3:22. Chiefs 26–0. **Drive: 4 plays, 38 yards, 1:51.**

**Fourth quarter**

- OAK – Marshawn Lynch 22-yard run (Giorgio Tavecchio kick), 8:51. Chiefs 26–7. **Drive: 6 plays, 67 yards, 2:28.**
- OAK – Jared Cook 29-yard pass from Derek Carr (Derek Carr–Michael Crabtree pass), 7:09. Chiefs 26–15. **Drive: 4 plays, 43 yards, 1:42.**

**Top passers**

- OAK – Derek Carr – 24/41, 211 yards, TD, 2 INT
- KC – Alex Smith – 20/34, 268 yards, INT

**Top rushers**

- OAK – Marshawn Lynch – 7 carries, 61 yards, TD
- KC – Kareem Hunt – 25 carries, 116 yards, TD

**Top receivers**

- OAK – Michael Crabtree – 7 receptions, 60 yards
- KC – Travis Kelce – 7 receptions, 74 yards

**Top tacklers**

- OAK – NaVorro Bowman – 9 tackles
- KC – Justin Houston – 5 tackles

With the Raiders tied with both the Chargers and Chiefs atop the AFC West, the Raiders traveled to Kansas City with only four games left in the season. Looking to give themselves the tiebreaker with the Chiefs and stay above .500 on the season, the Raiders failed miserably. The defense allowed a field goal on the Chiefs' first possession to fall behind 3–0. The Chiefs extended the lead on the first play of the second quarter as Kareem Hunt scored from one yard out. Trailing 10–0, the Raider offense was only able to get one first down on their first three possessions. The Chiefs, scoring on their third straight possession, got another field goal to move their lead to 13–0. The Raiders began to move the ball on their ensuing possession, moving into Chiefs territory. However, Derek Carr was intercepted at the Chief 24 to end the drive. The Chiefs added another field goal on the ensuing possession, moving the lead to 16–0 with 1:45 remaining in the half. The Raiders quickly went three and out, giving the Chiefs, who had scored on their first four possessions, the ball with 1:14 remaining. The defense was able to keep the Chiefs from scoring as the half ended.

The Chiefs began the second half with another field goal to take a 19–0 lead. A Raider three and out preceded the first punt of the game by the Chiefs. Looking to take advantage of the defense's first real stop of the game, Carr hit Johnny Holton on a 19-yard pass on the first play of the drive, but Holton fumbled and the Chiefs recovered. The Chiefs immediately turned the ball back over as Alex Smith was intercepted on the first play of the ensuing drive. However, the Raiders failed to convert on the turnover and punted to the Chiefs again. Four plays later Charcandrick West scored on a 13-yard run to extend the Chief lead to 26–0 and all but ending the game. After the teams exchanged punts, the Raiders finally scored with just under nine minutes left in the fourth quarter as Marshawn Lynch rushed 22 yards for a touchdown. Following a successful two-point conversion, the Raiders recovered an onside kick and Carr hit Jared Cook on a 29-yard pass to narrow the lead to 26–15. Electing not to attempt another onside kick, the Chiefs took over and were able to run nearly five minutes off the clock before punting to the Raiders with 2:39 remaining. The Raiders were able to move the ball, but Carr was intercepted in the end zone with 46 seconds left and the Chiefs were able to run out the clock. The 26–15 loss moved the Raiders to 6–7 on the season.

The Raiders again struggled as the defense gave up 408 yards while the offense managed only 268, most of which occurred after the game had been decided. The Chiefs out-rushed the Raiders 165–70 in the game as the Raiders fell to a game out of first in the AFC West. A Chargers victory on the day also meant the Raiders fell a game behind them as well.

==== Week 15: vs. Dallas Cowboys ====
Week Fifteen: Dallas Cowboys at Oakland Raiders – Game summary

Quarter	1	2	3	4	Total
**Cowboys**	3	7	7	3	**20**
Raiders	0	0	10	7	**17**

at Oakland–Alameda County Coliseum, Oakland, California

- Date: December 17
- Game time: 5:30 p.m. PST
- Game weather: 57 °F (14 °C), clear
- Game attendance: 55,372
- Referee: Gene Steratore
- TV announcers (NBC): Al Michaels, Cris Collinsworth and Michele Tafoya
- Recap, Gamebook

Game information

**First quarter**

- DAL – Dan Bailey 45-yard field goal, 4:56. Cowboys 3–0. **Drive: 9 plays, 41 yards, 4:08.**

**Second quarter**

- DAL – Rod Smith 1-yard run (Dan Bailey kick), 14:04. Cowboys 10–0. **Drive: 8 plyas, 65 yards, 4:45.**

**Third quarter**

- OAK – Michael Crabtree 2-yard pass from Derek Carr (Giorgio Tavecchio kick), 8:03. Cowboys 10–7. **Drive: 11 plays, 90 yards. 6:57.**
- OAK – Giorgio Tavecchio 39-yard field goal, 6:14. Tie 10–10. **Drive: 4 plays, 1 yard, 1:00.**
- DAL – Dak Prescott 5-yard run (Dan Bailey kick), 0:45. Cowboys 17–10. **Drive 11 plays, 75 yards, 5:29.**

**Fourth quarter**

- OAK – Michael Crabtree 2-yard pass from Derek Carr (Giorgio Tavecchio kick), 10:35. Tie 17–17. **Drive: 10 plays, 53 yards, 5:10.**
- DAL – Dan Bailey 19-yard field goal, 1:44. Cowboys 20–17. **Drive: 11 plays 69 yards, 4:46.**

**Top passers**

- DAL – Dak Prescott 18/27, 212 yards, 2 INT
- OAK – Derek Carr 21/38, 171 yards, 2 TD

**Top rushers**

- DAL – Alfred Morris 16 rushes, 61 yards
- OAK – Marshawn Lynch 16 rushes 76 yards

**Top receivers**

- DAL – Dez Bryant 2 receptions, 59 yards
- OAK – Seth Roberts 3 receptions, 52 yards

**Top tacklers**

- DAL – Sean Lee 10 tackles
- OAK – NaVorro Bowman 9 tackles

Looking to stay in the playoff hunt, the Raiders welcomed the Dallas Cowboys to Oakland for Sunday Night Football. The Raiders struggled from the outset, allowing the Cowboys to drive inside Raider territory before Sean Smith intercepted a Dak Prescott pass to end the drive. Following a punt by the Raiders, the Cowboys moved right down the field, but were stopped at the Oakland 27 yard line. Settling for a 45-yard field goal, the Cowboys took the lead. The Raiders failed to manage a first down again on their second possession, the Cowboys took over and moved down field again. This time, the Raider defense could not stop the Cowboys and Rod Smith scored on a one-yard run to increase the Cowboy lead to 10–0. The Raider offense did manage two first downs on their next possession, but again were forced to punt. After forcing a Cowboy punt, the Raiders took over with just over three minutes left in the half. The offense came alive as the Raiders moved down to the Cowboy 11 yard line. Derek Carr then hit Jared Cook for an 11-yard touchdown, but Cook was called for pass interference on the play and the touchdown was taken off the board. The Raiders drive stalled and, with three seconds remaining, Giorgio Tavecchio missed a 39-yard field goal as the half expired leaving the score at 10–0.

On the opening kickoff of the second half, Cordarrelle Patterson returned the kick 100 yards for a touchdown. However, the return was nullified on a Raider holding call. However, the Raider offense would make up for the mistake as they took the ball 90 yards and Carr found Michael Crabtree on a two-yard pass to narrow the lead to 10–7. On the ensuing Cowboy possession, Sean Smith intercepted Dak Prescott for the second time in the game and returned it 22 yards for a touchdown and Raider lead. Upon review of the play, it was determined that Smith was down by contact at the 22. The Raider offense failed to capitalize on the turnover, only managing one yard and settling for a Tavecchio 39-yard field goal to tie the game at 10. The Raider defense continued its strong play to start the second half by stopping the Cowboys on three plays on the next possession. However, punter Chris Jones took the snap and rushed around the right side of the line for a 24-yard gain and a first down. Nine plays later, Prescott scrambled in from five yards out to retake the lead 17–10. As the fourth quarter began, the Raiders answered as Carr again hit Crabtree from two yards out to cap a 53-yard drive to tie the game at 17. Following punts by both teams, the Cowboys moved to the Raider five-yard line as the two minute warning sounded. However, the Raider defense stiffened and the Cowboys could not get the ball in the end zone. Dan Bailey hit a 19-yard field goal with 1:47 remaining to give the Cowboys a 20–17 lead. Needing a field goal to tie, the Raiders drive stalled at their own 30 yard line with just over one minute remaining. On fourth down, Carr rolled out of the pocket and heaved the ball downfield to Crabtree who could not make the catch. But, the Cowboys were called for pass interference on the play and the Raiders took over on the Dallas 15, well within field goal range. Two plays later, Carr scrambled to the goal line and would have had a first down, but instead attempted to dive to the pylon to score the winning touchdown. Carr, however, lost control of the ball attempting to reach it into the end zone and fumbled it out of the end zone giving the ball to the Cowboys on a touchback. The Cowboys were able to a knee to end the game and secure the 20–17 win.

Carr threw for only 171 yards in the game as the offense, as usual, struggled through most of the game. The Raiders committed 14 penalties for 105 yards in the game as their disastrous season all but came to an end. With this loss, the Raiders fell to 6–8 on the season and were eliminated from the AFC West race. A week later, a Kansas City Chiefs win over the Miami Dolphins eliminated the Raiders from playoff contention a day before their Christmas game against the Philadelphia Eagles.

==== Week 16: at Philadelphia Eagles ====
NFL on Christmas Day

Week Sixteen: Oakland Raiders at Philadelphia Eagles – Game summary

Quarter	1	2	3	4	Total
Raiders	0	7	3	0	**10**
**Eagles**	7	0	3	9	**19**

at Lincoln Financial Field, Philadelphia, Pennsylvania

- Date: December 25
- Game time: 8:30 p.m. EST/5:30 p.m. PST
- Game weather: 29 °F (−2 °C), partly cloudy
- Game attendance: 69,596
- Referee: Ronald Torbert
- TV announcers (ESPN): Sean McDonough, Jon Gruden and Lisa Salters
- Recap, Gamebook

Game information

**First quarter**

- PHI – Jay Ajayi 17-yard pass from Nick Foles (Jake Elliott kick), 2:51. Eagles 7–0. **Drive: 11 plays, 58 yards, 6:16.**

**Second quarter**

- OAK – Amari Cooper 63-yard pass from Derek Carr (Giorgio Tavecchio kick), 12:36. Tie 7–7. **Drive: 3 plays, 74 yards, 1:24.**

**Third quarter**

- OAK – Giorgio Tavecchio 25-yard field goal, 10:56. Raiders 10–7. **Drive: 8 plays, 69 yards, 4:10.**
- PHI – Jake Elliott 35-yard field goal, 2:13. Tie 10–10. **Drive: 5 plays, 13 yards, 1:33.**

**Fourth quarter**

- PHI – Jake Elliott 48-yard field goal, 0:22. Eagles 13–10. **Drive: 6 plays, 21 yards, 0:32.**
- PHI – Derek Barnett 23-yard fumble return (no kick), 0:00. Eagles 19–10.

**Top passers**

- OAK – Derek Carr – 15/29, 140 yards, TD, 2 INT
- PHI – Nick Foles – 19/38, 163 yards, TD, INT

**Top rushers**

- OAK – Marshawn Lynch 25 rushes, 95 yards
- PHI – Jay Ajayi 14 carries, 52 yards

**Top receivers**

- OAK – Amari Cooper – 3 receptions, 66 yards, TD
- PHI – Zach Ertz – 9 receptions, 81 yards

**Top tacklers**

- OAK – NaVorro Bowman – 7 tackles
- PHI – Nigel Bradham – 8 tackles

With their playoff hopes already crushed, the Raiders traveled to Philadelphia for a Christmas night game against the NFL-best 12–2 Eagles. After the Eagles punted on their first drive, Oakland drove to the Eagles' 42, but failed convert on fourth down. Eagles quarterback Nick Foles, playing for the injured Carson Wentz, then led the team down the field and opened the scoring on a 17-yard touchdown pass to Jay Ajayi to put the home team up 7–0. After the teams traded punts, Carr threw a 63-yard touchdown pass to Amari Cooper to tie the game up early in the second quarter. Philadelphia found themselves in scoring position late in the half, but rookie kicker Jake Elliott missed a 33-yard try right before the half leaving the game tied at seven.

Starting the second half, the Raiders moved into Philly's red zone, but were held out of the end zone and forced to settle for a field goal by Giorgio Tavecchio to take a 10–7 lead. On the Raiders' next possession, Carr was intercepted by cornerback Patrick Robinson ending the Raiders promising drive. Two plays later, Ajayi fumbled and the Raiders took over. However, on the first offensive play for the Raiders, Marshawn Lynch to lost his first fumble of the season and resulting in three turnovers in four plays. The Eagles used that possession to kick another field goal to tie things up at 10-each. Defensive efforts and poor offense by both teams caused them to trade punts again going into the fourth quarter. The Raiders, taking over close to midfield, marched into Eagles territory, but Tavecchio missed a 48-yard field goal to leave the game tied. On the Eagles' next drive, Foles threw an interception and the Raiders drove deep into Philadelphia territory poised to take the lead. However, Jalen Richard turned the ball over on a fumble, the Raiders' third turnover of the game. Following punts by both teams, the Raiders took over near midfield with the opportunity to set up a potential game-winning drive. However, with less than a minute to go, Carr threw another pick, the Raiders fourth turnover in the game. Philadelphia used the momentum to close into field goal range, and Elliott connected on a 48-yard try to give the home team the lead with 22 seconds left. Oakland took over on their own 40 with all three timeouts, but moved nowhere. On fourth down, with three seconds left, the Raiders began to lateral the ball as the clock expired attempting to score, but ended up fumbling the ball and the Eagles Derek Barnett returned it for a touchdown. The Eagles took a knee on the extra point try.

The Raiders defense played well, allowing 216 yards to the Eagles, but the Raiders offense lost three fumbles in the game and Carr threw two interceptions. With the loss, the Raiders fell to 6–9 on the season, their third losing season in four years with Derek Carr as quarterback, and to third place in the division.

==== Week 17: at Los Angeles Chargers ====
Week Seventeen: Oakland Raiders at Los Angeles Chargers – Game summary

Quarter	1	2	3	4	Total
Raiders	0	10	0	0	**10**
**Chargers**	0	20	10	0	**30**

at StubHub Center, Carson, California

- Date: December 31
- Game time: 1:25 p.m. PST
- Game weather: 62 °F (17 °C), hazy
- Game attendance: 25,430
- Referee: Ed Hochuli
- TV announcers (CBS): Kevin Harlan and Rich Gannon
- Recap, Gamebook

Game information

**First quarter**

- No scoring plays.

**Second quarter**

- LAC – Keenan Allen 27-yard fumble recovery (Nick Rose kick), 13:09. Chargers 7–0. **Drive: 9 plays, 99 yards, 4:27.**
- OAK – Amari Cooper 87-yard pass from Derek Carr (Giorgio Tavecchio kick), 11:38. Tied 7–7. **Drive: 4 plays, 75 yards, 1:31.**
- OAK – Giorgio Tavecchio 40-yard field goal, 7:27. Raiders 10–7. **Drive: 4 plays, 8 yards, 1:06.**
- LAC – Tyrell Williams 56-yard pass from Philip Rivers (Nick Rose kick), 5:12. Chargers 14–10. **Drive: 4 plays, 75 yards, 2:15.**

**Third quarter**

- LAC – Keenan Allen 6-yard pass from Philip Rivers (kick blocked), 0:24. Chargers 20–10. **Drive: 8 plays, 77 yards, 1:24.**
- LAC – Nick Rose 25-yard field goal, 10:39. Chargers 23–10. **Drive: 10 plays, 68 yards, 4:21.**
- LAC – Travis Benjamin 62-yard pass from Philip Rivers (Nick Rose kick), 0:53. Chargers 30–10. **Drive: 9 plays, 82 yards, 4:50.**

**Fourth quarter**

- No scoring plays.

**Top passers**

- OAK – Derek Carr – 19/28, 243 yards, TD, INT
- LAC – Philip Rivers – 28/37, 387 yards, 3 TD

**Top rushers**

- OAK – Marshawn Lynch – 19 carries, 101 yards
- LAC – Melvin Gordon – 17 carries, 93 yards

**Top receivers**

- OAK – Amari Cooper – 3 receptions, 115 yards, TD
- LAC – Keenan Allen – 9 receptions, 133 yards, TD

**Top tacklers**

- OAK – NaVorro Bowman – 13 tackles
- LAC – Desmond King – 9 tackles

The Raiders headed back to Los Angeles for the first time in 23 years looking to avoid a four-game losing streak and help keep the Chargers out of the playoffs.

Neither team started well in the first quarter as the team exchanged punts before the Chargers took over near the end of the quarter. On the sixth play of the second quarter, LA's Melvin Gordon fumbled the ball at the Raider 29 yard line, but the fumble was recovered by Charger receiver Keenan Allen who ran 27 yards for the touchdown and a 7–0 lead. The Raiders quickly answered as Derek Carr hit Amari Cooper for an 87-yard touchdown pass to tie the game at seven. Following a blocked field goal attempt, the Raiders took over at the Charger 30 yard line, but could not get a first down and settled for a Giorgio Tavecchio 40-yard field goal to take a 10–7 lead. The Chargers quickly regained the lead as Philip Rivers hit Tyrell Williams for a 56-yard touchdown a 14–10 lead. With just under two minutes remaining in the half, Carr was intercepted at the Charger 23. The Chargers took advantage moving the ball quickly down the field on eight plays before Rivers hit Allen to move the lead to 21–10 with 24 second left in the half.

In the second half, the Chargers added to the lead with a 25-yard field goal and the Raiders turned the ball over on downs at the Charger 18 yard line. The Chargers put the game out of reach when Rivers hit Travis Benjamin for a 62-yard score and a 30–10 lead. Neither team managed anything further as the Raiders turned the ball over on a Carr fumble and turn over on downs in the fourth quarter.

The loss left the Raiders at 6–10 on the season and marked their 14th season without a winning record in the previous 15 seasons, and their 11th season with double digit losses in the previous 15 seasons.

Following the game, due to a 4-game losing streak, the Raiders fired head coach Jack Del Rio.

=== Standings ===
==== Division ====
AFC West
	W	L	T	PCT	DIV	CONF	PF	PA	STK
^{(4)} Kansas City Chiefs	10	6	0	.625	5–1	8–4	415	339	W4
Los Angeles Chargers	9	7	0	.563	3–3	6–6	355	272	W2
Oakland Raiders	6	10	0	.375	2–4	5–7	301	373	L4
Denver Broncos	5	11	0	.313	2–4	4–8	289	382	L2

==== Conference ====
AFC
#	Team	Division	W	L	T	PCT	DIV	CONF	SOS	SOV	STK
**Division leaders**
1 (Note: New England claimed the No. 1 seed over Pittsburgh based on head-to-head victory.)	New England Patriots	East	13	3	0	.813	5–1	10–2	.484	.466	W3
2	Pittsburgh Steelers	North	13	3	0	.813	6–0	10–2	.453	.423	W2
3 (Note: Jacksonville claimed the No. 3 seed over Kansas City based on conference record.)	Jacksonville Jaguars	South	10	6	0	.625	4–2	9–3	.434	.394	L2
4	Kansas City Chiefs	West	10	6	0	.625	5–1	8–4	.477	.481	W4
**Wild Cards**
5 (Note: Tennessee finished ahead of Buffalo, Baltimore and Los Angeles Chargers based on conference record, claiming the No. 5 seed. Buffalo and Baltimore finished ahead of Los Angeles Chargers based on conference record. Buffalo claimed the No. 6 seed over Baltimore based on strength of victory.)	Tennessee Titans	South	9	7	0	.563	5–1	8–4	.434	.396	W1
6	Buffalo Bills	East	9	7	0	.563	3–3	7–5	.492	.396	W1
**Did not qualify for the postseason**
7	Baltimore Ravens	North	9	7	0	.563	3–3	7–5	.441	.299	L1
8	Los Angeles Chargers	West	9	7	0	.563	3–3	6–6	.457	.347	W2
9	Cincinnati Bengals	North	7	9	0	.438	3–3	6–6	.465	.321	W2
10 (Note: Oakland finished ahead of Miami based on head-to-head victory.)	Oakland Raiders	West	6	10	0	.375	2–4	5–7	.512	.396	L4
11	Miami Dolphins	East	6	10	0	.375	2–4	5–7	.543	.531	L3
12 (Note: Denver finished ahead of the New York Jets based on head-to-head victory.)	Denver Broncos	West	5	11	0	.313	2–4	4–8	.492	.413	L2
13	New York Jets	East	5	11	0	.313	2–4	5–7	.520	.438	L4
14 (Note: Indianapolis finished ahead of Houston based on head-to-head sweep.)	Indianapolis Colts	South	4	12	0	.250	2–4	3–9	.480	.219	W1
15	Houston Texans	South	4	12	0	.250	1–5	3–9	.516	.375	L6
16	Cleveland Browns	North	0	16	0	.000	0–6	0–12	.520	–	L16
**Tiebreakers** (Note: When breaking ties for three or more teams under the NFL's rules, they are first broken within divisions, then comparing only the highest ranked remaining team from each division.)

== Statistics ==
=== Team leaders ===
Category	Player(s)	Value
Passing yards	Derek Carr	3,496
Passing touchdowns	Derek Carr	22
Rushing yards	Marshawn Lynch	891
Rushing touchdowns	Marshawn Lynch	7
Receptions	Michael Crabtree	58
Receiving yards	Jared Cook	688
Receiving touchdowns	Michael Crabtree	8
Points	Giorgio Tavecchio	81
Kickoff return yards	Cordarrelle Patterson	538
Punt return yards	Jalen Richard	155
Tackles	T. J. Carrie	70
Sacks	Khalil Mack	10.5
Forced fumbles	Bruce Irvin	4
Interceptions	Sean Smith	2

=== League rankings ===
Offense
Category	Value	NFL rank (out of 32)
Total yards	5,185	17
Yards per play	5.4	13
Rushing yards	1,554	25
Yards per rush	4.2	13
Passing yards	3,631	16
Yards per pass	6.7	20
Total touchdowns	36	20
Rushing touchdowns	13	12
Receiving touchdowns	23	17
Scoring	301	23
Pass Completions	347	14
Third downs	82/204 (.402)	12
Turnovers	28	4
Interceptions	14	11

Defense
Category	Value	NFL rank (out of 32)
Total yards	5,601	23
Yards per play	5.6	27
Rushing yards	1,743	12
Yards per rush	4.0	10
Passing yards	3,858	26
Yards per pass	6.9	27
Total touchdowns	38	17
Rushing touchdowns	11	13
Receiving touchdowns	24	19
Scoring	373	20
Pass completions	361	24
Third downs	88/215 (.409)	26
First downs allowed	187	16
Sacks	31	25
Takeaway	14	30
Interceptions	5	32

Special Teams
Category	Value	NFL rank (out of 32)
Kickoff return average	21.7	15
Punt return average	5.7	30
Punt yards	3,271	18
Yards per punt	47.4	5
Field goals	16/21 (.762)	24
Extra points	33/34 (.971)	9
