= Nicholas Morrow =

American football player (born 1995)

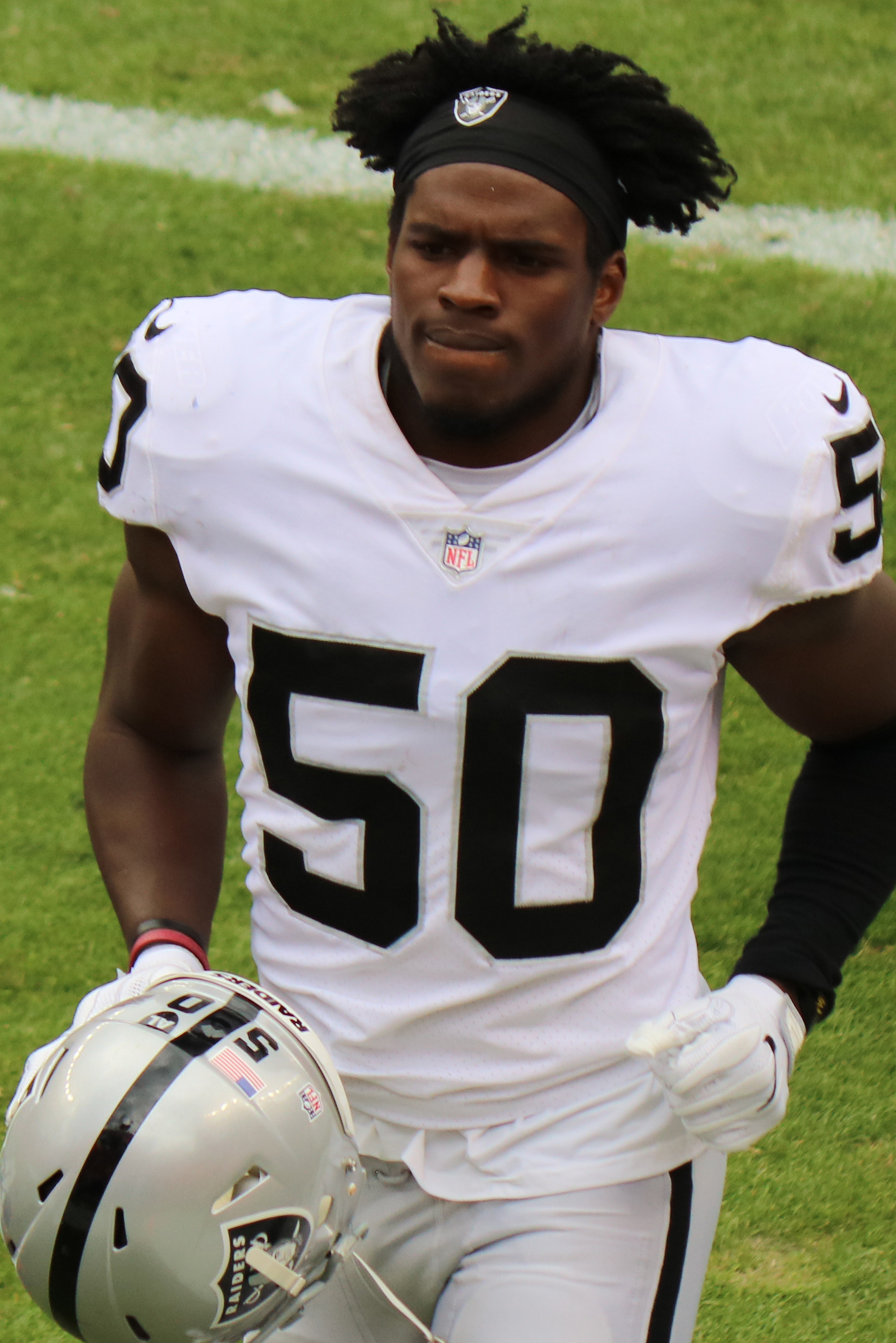
- Morrow with the Oakland Raiders in 2017

Profile
- Position: Linebacker

Personal information
- Born: July 10, 1995 (age 31); St. Louis, Missouri, U.S.
- Listed height: 6 ft 0 in (1.83 m)
- Listed weight: 216 lb (98 kg)

Career information
- High school: Huntsville (Huntsville, Alabama)
- College: Greenville (2013–2016)
- NFL draft: 2017: undrafted

Career history
- Oakland / Las Vegas Raiders (2017–2021); Chicago Bears (2022); Philadelphia Eagles (2023); Buffalo Bills (2024); Philadelphia Eagles (2024)

Awards and highlights
- Super Bowl champion (LIX)

Career NFL statistics as of 2024
- Total tackles: 468
- Sacks: 7.0
- Forced fumbles: 3
- Fumble recoveries: 3
- Pass deflections: 27
- Interceptions: 3
- Stats at Pro Football Reference

Nicholas Morrow (born July 10, 1995) is an American professional football linebacker. He played college football for the Greenville Panthers.

== College career ==
Morrow attended Greenville University in Greenville, Illinois.

== Professional career ==
Pre-draft measurables
Height	Weight	Arm length	Hand span	40-yard dash	10-yard split	20-yard split	20-yard shuttle	Three-cone drill	Vertical jump	Broad jump	Bench press
6 ft 0 3/8 in (1.84 m)	216 lb (98 kg)	32 in (0.81 m)	9 1/8 in (0.23 m)	4.52 s	1.66 s	2.63 s	4.45 s	7.08 s	37 in (0.94 m)	10 ft 3 in (3.12 m)	23 reps
All values from Northwestern's Pro Day

=== Oakland / Las Vegas Raiders ===
==== 2017 ====
On May 4, 2017, the Oakland Raiders signed Morrow to a three-year, $1.67 million contract that included a signing bonus of $7,500. Morrow became the first Greenville player to sign an NFL contract.

He entered training camp as a linebacker and performed well enough to compete for a job as a starting linebacker against Marquel Lee and Tyrell Adams. Head coach Jack Del Rio named Morrow the primary backup weakside linebacker, behind Cory James, to begin the regular season.

He made his professional regular season debut during the Raiders' season-opener at the Tennessee Titans and made one solo tackle as they won 26–16. On October 15, 2017, Morrow earned his first career start at middle linebacker against the San Diego Chargers after Marquel Lee sustained an ankle injury the previous week. Morrow completed their 17–16 loss to the Chargers with five combined tackles (three solo) and one pass deflection. On December 3, 2017, Morrow earned his third start of the season and collected a season-high nine combined tackles (three solo) during a 24–17 win against the New York Giants. He completed his rookie campaign with a total of 60 combined tackles (40 solo) and four pass deflections in 16 games and five starts. On December 31, 2017, the Oakland Raiders officially announced their decision to fire head coach Jack Del Rio after they finished the 2017 NFL season with a 6–10 record.

==== 2018 ====
Throughout training camp, Morrow competed to be the starting weakside linebacker against Emmanuel Lamur and Marquel Lee after the departure of Cory James. Head coach Jon Gruden named Morrow the backup strongside linebacker, behind Tahir Whitehead, to begin the regular season.

On November 25, 2018, Morrow earned his first start of the season and made four solo tackles and had his first career sack during the Raiders' 34–17 loss at the Baltimore Ravens. He sacked Ravens' quarterback Lamar Jackson for a four-yard loss in the first quarter. The following week, Morrow collected a season-high seven solo tackles during a 40–33 loss against the Kansas City Chiefs in Week 13. Morrow finished the 2018 NFL season with 43 combined tackles (30 solo), three pass deflections, one sack, and a forced fumble in 16 games and five starts.

==== 2019 ====
Morrow entered training camp as a backup outside linebacker after the Raiders signed free agents Vontaze Burfict and Brandon Marshall. He competed against Marquel Lee and Jason Cabinda to be the primary backup. Head coach John Gruden named Morrow the backup weak side linebacker to begin the season, behind Marquel Lee.

In Week 5, Morrow earned his first start of the season, replacing an injured Marquel Lee, and recorded four solo tackles, deflected a pass, and made his first career interception as the Raiders defeated the Chicago Bears 24–21. Morrow intercepted a pass attempt by quarterback Chase Daniel, that was intended for wide receiver Allen Robinson, and returned it for an 11-yard gain in the first quarter. Morrow remained the starter for eight consecutive games (Weeks 5–13), but was demoted for the last four games to backup after the Raiders signed Will Compton. On November 24, 2019, Morrow collected a season-high ten combined tackles (five solo) during a 34–3 loss at the New York Jets in Week 12. Morrow finished the 2019 NFL season with 67 combined tackles (49 solo), four pass deflections, and one interception in 16 games and eight starts.

==== 2020 ====
On March 18, 2020, the Las Vegas Raiders announced their decision to place a second round tender on Morrow. On April 13, 2020, the Raiders signed Morrow to a one-year, $3.259 million contract.

In Week 2 against the New Orleans Saints on Monday Night Football, Morrow led the team with 7 tackles and recorded his first interception of the season off a pass thrown by Drew Brees during the 34–24 win. In Week 10 against the Denver Broncos, Morrow recorded his first sack of the season on Drew Lock during the 37–12 win. He was placed on the reserve/COVID-19 list by the Raiders on December 24, 2020, and activated on December 29. In Week 17 against the Denver Broncos, Morrow recorded a season high 11 tackles and sacked Drew Lock once during the 32–31 win.

==== 2021 ====
On March 19, 2021, Morrow re-signed with the Raiders on a one-year contract. He was placed on injured reserve on September 2, 2021.

=== Chicago Bears ===
On March 16, 2022, Morrow signed a one-year contract with the Chicago Bears.

=== Philadelphia Eagles ===
On March 21, 2023, Morrow signed a one-year contract with the Philadelphia Eagles. He was released on August 29, and later re-signed to the practice squad. Morrow was promoted to the active roster on September 12.

=== Buffalo Bills ===
On March 14, 2024, Morrow signed a one–year contract with the Buffalo Bills. He was waived on January 2, 2025.

=== Philadelphia Eagles (second stint) ===
On January 14, 2025, Morrow signed with the Philadelphia Eagles to replace Nakobe Dean, whose season was ended due to an injury. He won a Super Bowl championship when the Eagles defeated the Kansas City Chiefs 40–22 in Super Bowl LIX.

== NFL career statistics ==
Legend
**Bold**	Career high

=== Regular season ===
Year	Team	Games		Tackles					Interceptions						Fumbles	
Year	Team	GP	GS	Comb	Solo	Ast	Sck	SFTY	PD	Int	Yds	Avg	Lng	TD	FF	FR
2017	OAK	16	5	60	40	20	0.0	0	4	0	0	0.0	0	0	0	0
2018	OAK	16	5	43	30	13	1.0	0	3	0	0	0.0	0	0	**1**	0
2019	OAK	16	8	73	53	20	0.0	0	4	**1**	**11**	**11.0**	**11**	0	0	0
2020	LV	14	11	78	62	16	**3.0**	0	**9**	**1**	6	6.0	6	0	**1**	1
2021	LV	0	0	Did not play due to injury												
2022	CHI	17	17	**116**	**83**	**33**	0.0	0	2	**1**	5	5.0	5	0	0	0
2023	PHI	15	12	95	66	29	**3.0**	**1**	5	0	0	0.0	0	0	**1**	**2**
2024	BUF	11	0	3	0	3	0.0	0	0	0	0	0.0	0	0	0	0
Career		105	58	468	334	134	7.0	1	27	3	22	7.3	11	0	3	3

=== Postseason ===
Year	Team	Games		Tackles					Interceptions						Fumbles	
Year	Team	GP	GS	Comb	Solo	Ast	Sck	SFTY	PD	Int	Yds	Avg	Lng	TD	FF	FR
2023	PHI	1	1	**10**	**7**	**3**	0.0	0	0	0	0	0.0	0	0	0	0
2024	PHI	3	0	3	1	2	0.0	0	0	0	0	0.0	0	0	0	0
Career		4	1	13	8	5	0.0	0	0	0	0	0.0	0	0	0	0
