= David Sharpe (American football) =

American football player (born 1995)

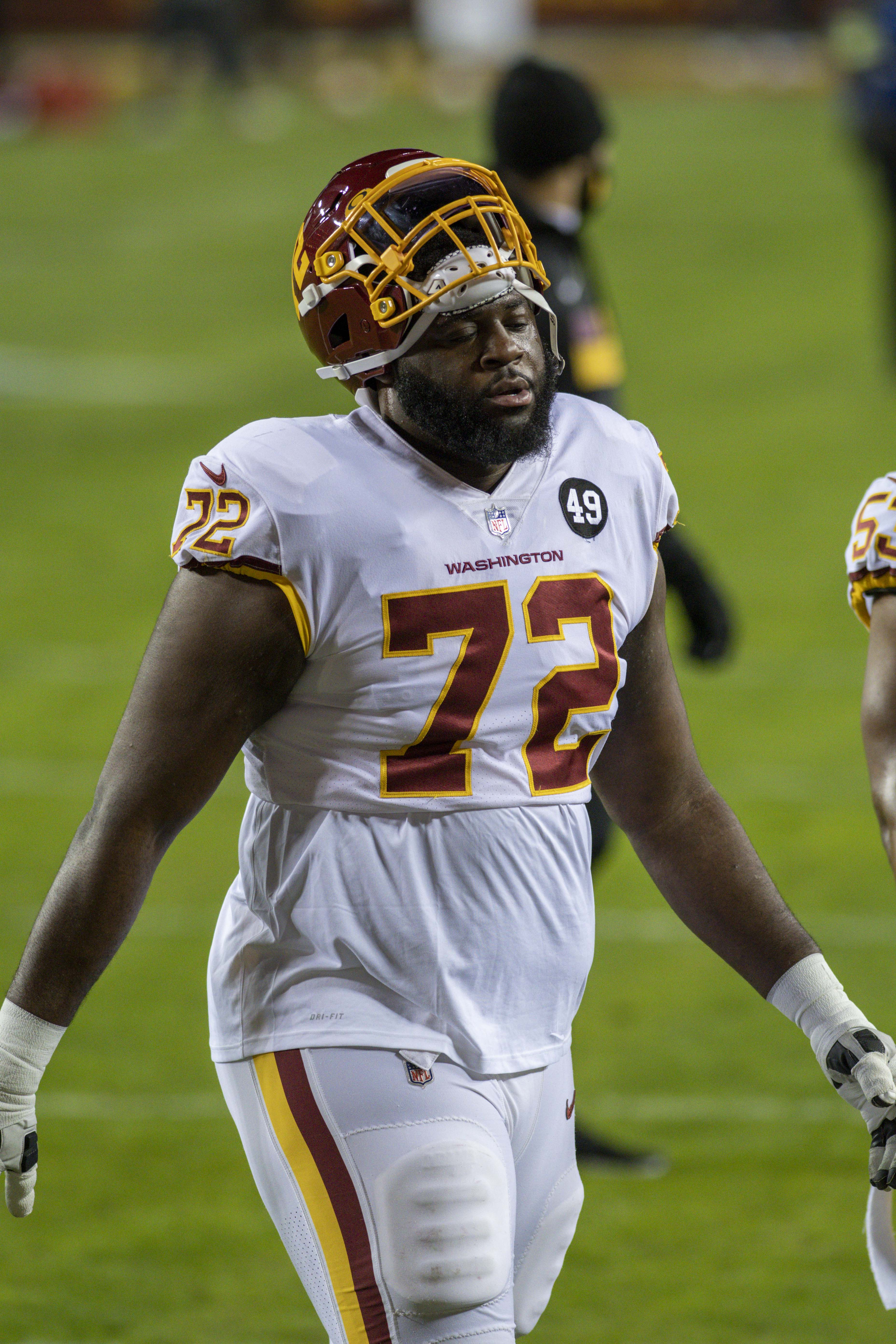
- Sharpe with the Washington Football Team in 2021

Profile
- Position: Offensive tackle

Personal information
- Born: October 21, 1995 (age 31); Jacksonville, Florida, U.S.
- Listed height: 6 ft 6 in (1.98 m)
- Listed weight: 346 lb (157 kg)

Career information
- High school: Duncan U. Fletcher (Neptune Beach, Florida)
- College: Florida (2014–2016)
- NFL draft: 2017: 4th round, 129th overall pick

Career history
- Oakland Raiders (2017); Houston Texans (2018); Oakland Raiders (2018–2019); Washington Football Team (2020); Baltimore Ravens (2021–2022); Carolina Panthers (2023); Houston Texans (2024)*; New York Jets (2024)*; Los Angeles Chargers (2025); Pittsburgh Steelers (2025)*; Baltimore Ravens (2026)*
- * Offseason or practice squad member only

Career NFL statistics as of Week 6, 2025
- Games played: 46
- Games started: 6
- Stats at Pro Football Reference

David Sharpe (born October 21, 1995) is an American professional football offensive tackle. He played college football for the Florida Gators and was selected by the Oakland Raiders in the fourth round of the 2017 NFL draft. He has also played for the Houston Texans, Carolina Panthers, and Washington Football Team.

== Professional career ==
Pre-draft measurables
Height	Weight	Arm length	Hand span	Wingspan	40-yard dash	10-yard split	20-yard split	20-yard shuttle	Three-cone drill	Vertical jump	Broad jump	Bench press
6 ft 6 1/4 in (1.99 m)	343 lb (156 kg)	35 3/8 in (0.90 m)	10 in (0.25 m)	7 ft 3 in (2.21 m)	5.44 s	1.90 s	3.11 s	4.78 s	7.87 s	20.5 in (0.52 m)	8 ft 1 in (2.46 m)	19 reps
All values from NFL Combine

=== Oakland Raiders (first stint) ===
Sharpe was selected by the Oakland Raiders in the fourth round (129th overall) in the 2017 NFL draft. On September 1, 2018, Sharpe was waived by the Raiders.

=== Houston Texans (first stint) ===
On September 12, 2018, Sharpe was signed by the Houston Texans to their practice squad. On September 25, Sharpe was promoted to the active roster. He was waived on October 31.

=== Oakland Raiders (second stint) ===
On November 1, 2018, Sharpe was claimed off waivers by the Raiders. On April 16, 2020, Sharpe was re-signed to a one-year contract.

=== Washington Football Team ===
On September 1, 2020, the Raiders traded Sharpe and a seventh round pick in the 2021 NFL draft to the Washington Football Team in exchange for a sixth round pick in the same draft. In the first 9 games of the season, Sharpe mainly played a backup role at right tackle. He started at right tackle in a Week 11 win against the Cincinnati Bengals; starting right tackle Morgan Moses was moved to left tackle in place of Geron Christian and Cornelius Lucas, who were both injured.

Sharpe re-signed with the team on March 29, 2021. Sharpe was placed on the team's COVID-19 reserve list on July 1, and was activated on August 23. He was waived on August 31.

=== Baltimore Ravens (first stint) ===
On September 21, 2021, the Baltimore Ravens signed Sharpe to their practice squad. On October 23, Sharpe was elevated to the Ravens' active roster for a Week 7 loss to the Cincinnati Bengals, a game in which he played 12 snaps. He reverted to the practice squad after the game. On December 31, Sharpe was promoted to the active roster.

On August 30, 2022, Sharpe was released by the Ravens and signed to the practice squad the next day. Sharpe was signed a reserve/future contract on January 1, 2023.

On August 29, 2023, Sharpe was released by the Ravens.

=== Carolina Panthers ===
On September 1, 2023, Sharpe was signed to the Carolina Panthers' practice squad. He was promoted to the active roster on September 11. Sharpe was released on November 8, and re-signed with the practice squad on November 13. He was promoted to the active roster again the next day.

=== Houston Texans (second stint) ===
On March 15, 2024, Sharpe re-signed with the Houston Texans. He was released on August 27, and re-signed to the practice squad. Sharpe was released on November 12.

=== New York Jets ===
On December 31, 2024, the New York Jets signed Sharpe to their practice squad.

=== Los Angeles Chargers ===
On August 9, 2025, Sharpe signed with the Los Angeles Chargers. He was released on August 26 as part of final roster cuts and re-signed to the practice squad the next day. On December 2, Sharpe was released by Los Angeles.

=== Pittsburgh Steelers ===
On December 10, 2025, Sharpe signed with the Pittsburgh Steelers' practice squad. He was released by the Steelers on January 6, 2026.

=== Baltimore Ravens (second stint) ===
On August 18, 2026, Sharpe signed with the Baltimore Ravens. On August 30, he was released by Baltimore as a part of final roster cuts.

=== Statistics ===
Year	Team	GP	GS
2017	OAK	5	2
2018	HOU	10	0
2019	OAK	9	2
2020	WAS	10	2
2021	BAL	2	0
2023	CAR	6	0
Career		42	6
