= Jylan Ware =

American football player (born 1993)

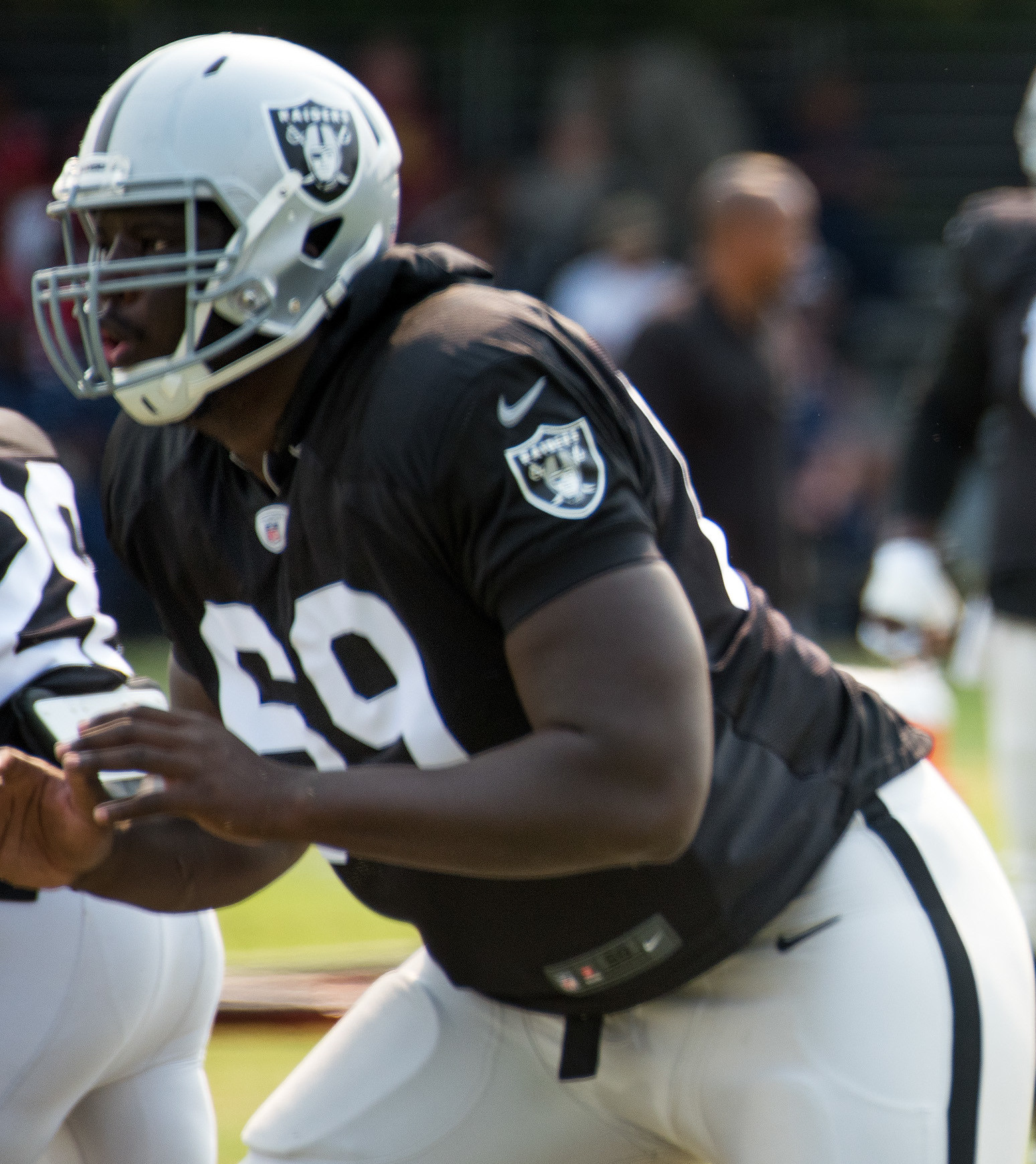
- Ware with the Oakland Raiders in 2018

No. 69
- Position: Offensive tackle

Personal information
- Born: October 16, 1993 (age 33); Valley, Alabama, U.S.
- Listed height: 6 ft 7 in (2.01 m)
- Listed weight: 317 lb (144 kg)

Career information
- High school: Valley
- College: Alabama State
- NFL draft: 2017: 7th round, 231st overall pick

Career history
- Oakland Raiders (2017); New York Giants (2018–2019)*; Washington Redskins (2019)*
- * Offseason or practice squad member only

Career NFL statistics
- Games played: 1
- Stats at Pro Football Reference

Jylan Ware (born October 16, 1993) is an American former professional football player who was an offensive tackle in the National Football League (NFL). He played college football for the Alabama State Hornets, and was selected in the seventh round of the 2017 NFL draft by the Oakland Raiders.

== College career ==
Playing at Alabama State University, Ware started for three years. His main tools in college were above-average athleticism and good hands.

== Professional career ==
Pre-draft measurables
Height	Weight	Arm length	Hand span	40-yard dash	10-yard split	20-yard split	20-yard shuttle	Three-cone drill	Vertical jump	Broad jump
6 ft 7 1/2 in (2.02 m)	317 lb (144 kg)	33 1/2 in (0.85 m)	9 3/4 in (0.25 m)	4.99 s	1.73 s	2.94 s	4.70 s	7.96 s	29.0 in (0.74 m)	9 ft 5 in (2.87 m)
All values from Pro Day

=== Oakland Raiders ===
Ware was drafted by the Oakland Raiders in the seventh round, 231st overall, in the 2017 NFL draft.

On September 1, 2018, Ware was waived by the Raiders.

=== New York Giants ===
On October 2, 2018, Ware was signed to the practice squad of the New York Giants. He signed a reserve/future contract with the Giants on January 2, 2019. He was waived on April 30, 2019.

=== Washington Redskins ===
Ware signed with Washington Redskins on May 28, 2019, but was waived two days later.

== Personal life ==
Ware had offers to play basketball in college but instead decided to play football. He earned his bachelor's degree in rehabilitation services from Alabama State.
