= Johnny Holton =

American football player (born 1991)

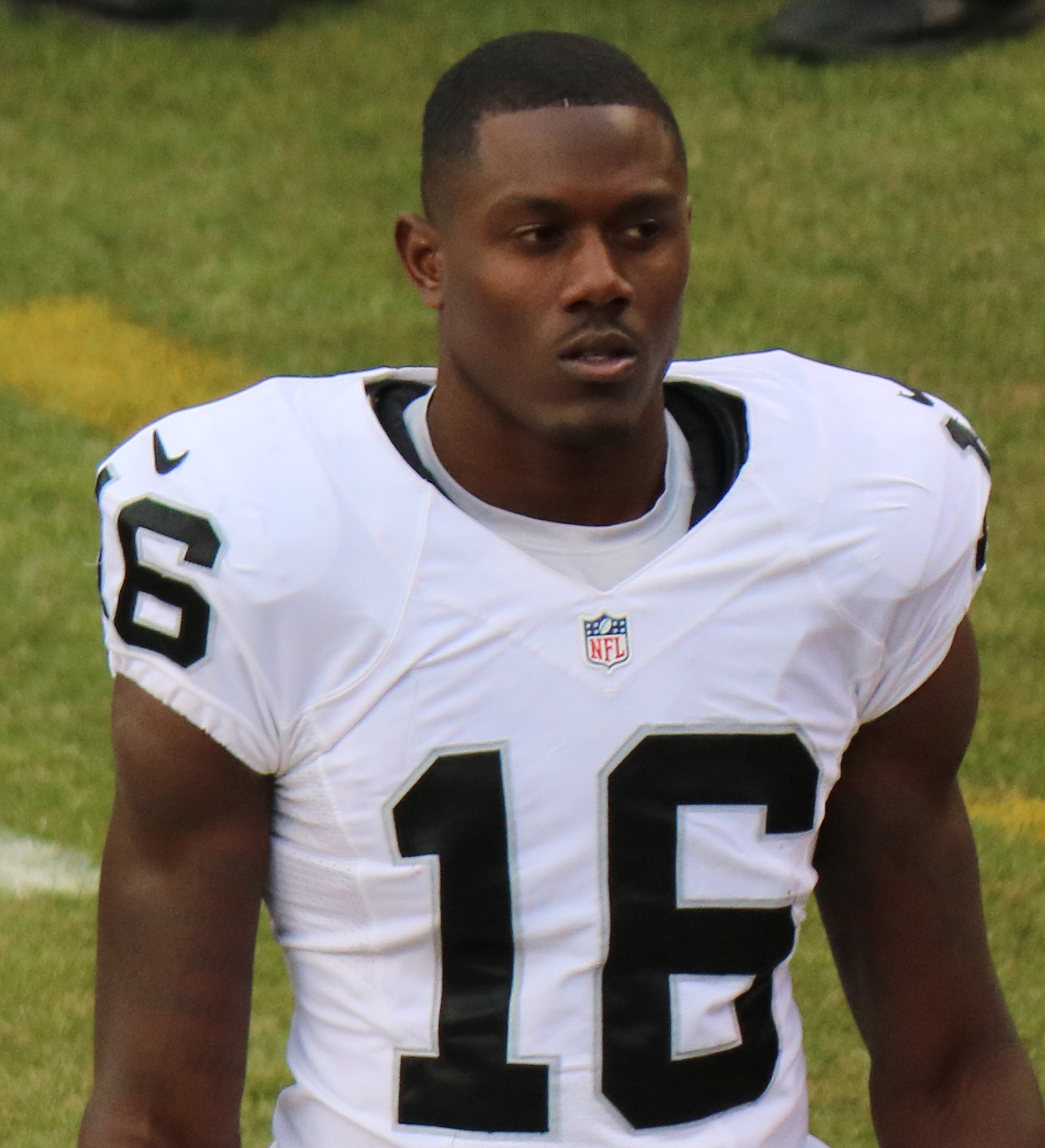
- Holton with the Oakland Raiders in 2017

No. 16, 80
- Position: Wide receiver

Personal information
- Born: August 22, 1991 (age 35); Miami, Florida, U.S.
- Listed height: 6 ft 1 in (1.85 m)
- Listed weight: 190 lb (86 kg)

Career information
- High school: Coconut Grove (Miami)
- College: Cincinnati
- NFL draft: 2016: undrafted

Career history
- Oakland Raiders (2016–2018); Philadelphia Eagles (2019)*; Pittsburgh Steelers (2019); New York Giants (2020)*
- * Offseason or practice squad member only

Career NFL statistics
- Receptions: 14
- Receiving yards: 273
- Receiving touchdowns: 3
- Stats at Pro Football Reference

Johnny Holton Jr. (born August 22, 1991) is an American former professional football player who was a wide receiver in the National Football League (NFL). He played college football for the Cincinnati Bearcats and was signed by the Oakland Raiders as an undrafted free agent in 2016. He was also a member of the Philadelphia Eagles, Pittsburgh Steelers, and New York Giants.

== College career ==
Holton was recruited to play junior college football at the College of Dupage. There, Holton excelled on the field at wide receiver over his two years at the school. After his time there, he had offers from the University of Alabama, Florida State University, Ohio State University, TSU and Auburn but he chose Cincinnati to continue his college career.

== Professional career ==
Pre-draft measurables
Height	Weight	Arm length	Hand span	40-yard dash	Vertical jump	Broad jump	Bench press
6 ft 0 5/8 in (1.84 m)	190 lb (86 kg)	32 7/8 in (0.84 m)	9 7/8 in (0.25 m)	4.54 s	31.5 in (0.80 m)	10 ft 3 in (3.12 m)	8 reps
All values from NFL Combine

=== Oakland Raiders ===
On May 10, 2016, Holton signed with the Oakland Raiders as an undrafted free agent following the conclusion of the 2016 NFL draft. He played in 15 games his rookie season, recording two receptions for 34 yards while playing regular role on special teams.

On September 3, 2018, Holton was waived by the Raiders and was later re-signed to the practice squad, with his position being changed from wide receiver to cornerback. He was promoted to the active roster on November 21, 2018, as a wide receiver. He was waived on November 26, 2018, and re-signed to the practice squad.

=== Philadelphia Eagles ===
On January 15, 2019, Holton signed a reserve/future contract with the Philadelphia Eagles. He was waived on May 8, 2019.

=== Pittsburgh Steelers ===
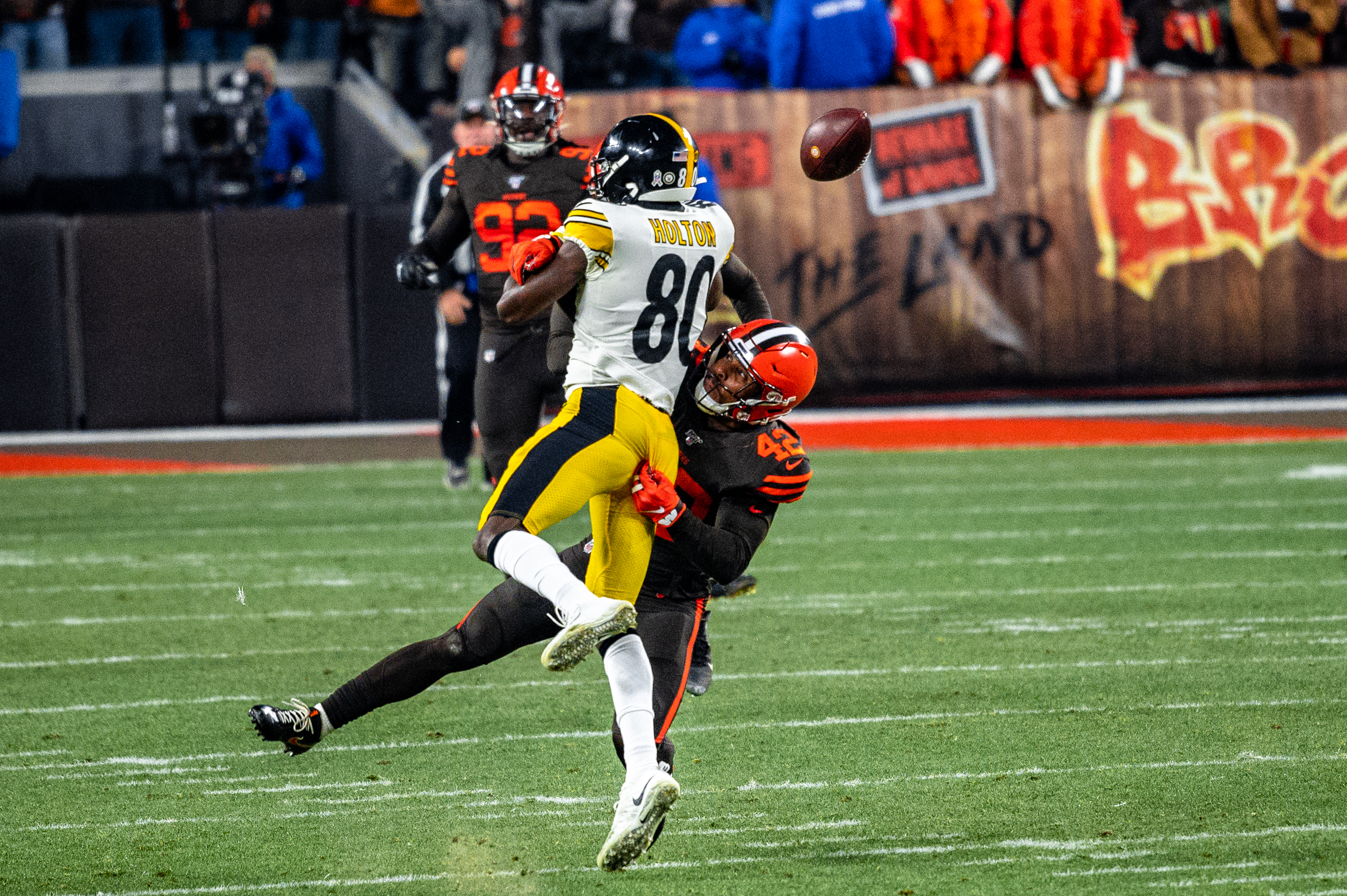
Holton in a game against the Cleveland Browns in 2019

On May 13, 2019, Holton signed with the Pittsburgh Steelers. He was waived on August 31, 2019, and was signed to the practice squad the next day. He was promoted to the active roster on September 7, 2019.

The Steelers released Holton on March 16, 2020.

=== New York Giants ===
Holton was signed by the New York Giants on September 2, 2020. He was released on September 5, 2020, and signed to the practice squad the next day. He was elevated to the active roster on September 26 for the team's week 3 game against the San Francisco 49ers, and reverted to the practice squad after the game on September 28. He was released on October 5, 2020.
