= Marquel Lee =

American gridiron football player (born 1995)

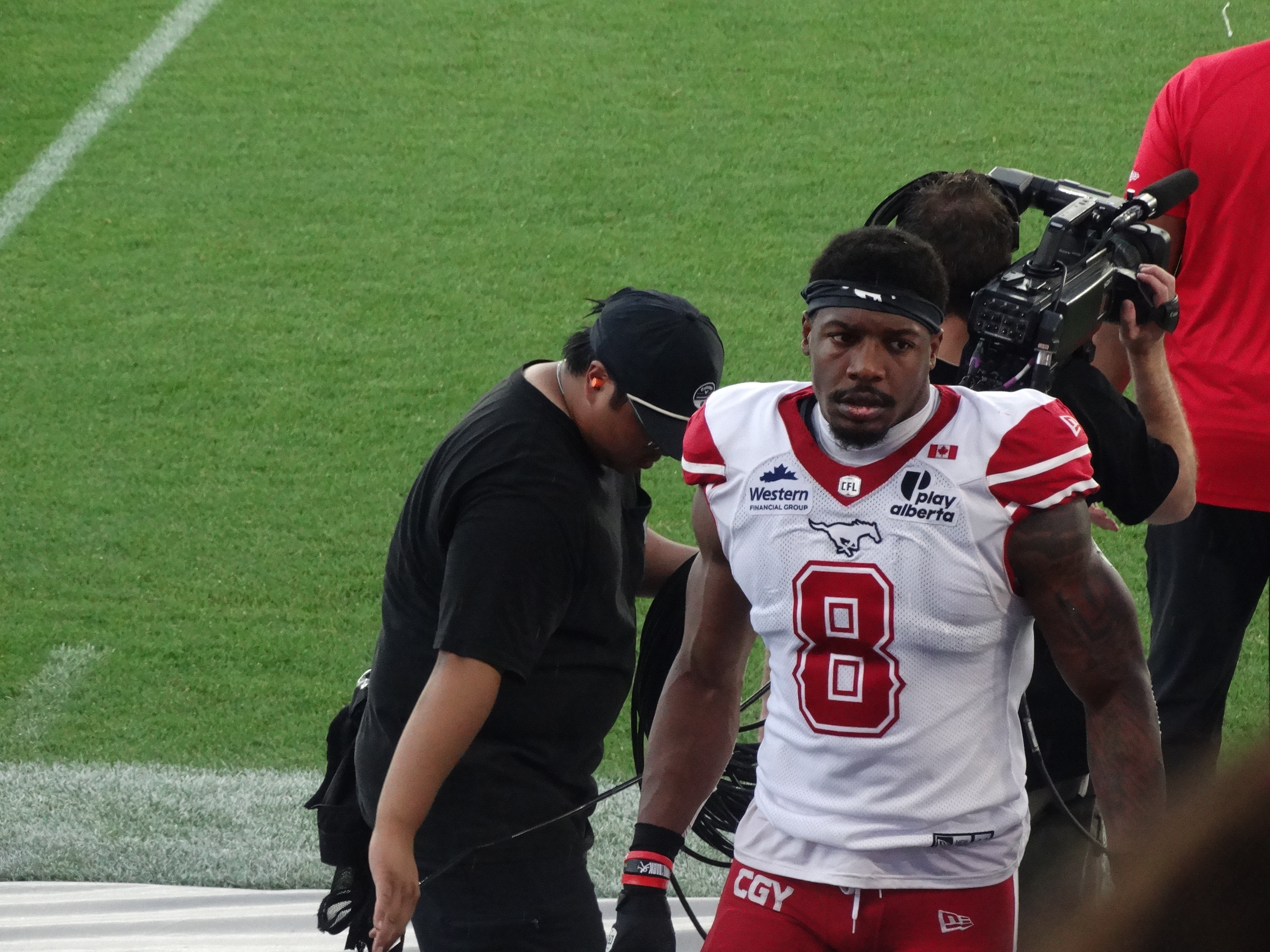
- Lee with the Calgary Stampeders in 2026

No. 8 – Calgary Stampeders
- Position: Linebacker
- Roster status: Active
- CFL status: American

Personal information
- Born: October 21, 1995 (age 31); San Diego, California, U.S.
- Listed height: 6 ft 3 in (1.91 m)
- Listed weight: 233 lb (106 kg)

Career information
- High school: Westlake (Waldorf, Maryland)
- College: Wake Forest (2013–2016)
- NFL draft: 2017: 5th round, 168th overall pick

Career history
- Oakland Raiders (2017–2019); Buffalo Bills (2021)*; Las Vegas Raiders (2021); Buffalo Bills (2022)*; Arlington Renegades (2024); Calgary Stampeders (2024–present)
- * Offseason or practice squad member only

Awards and highlights
- Second-team All-ACC (2016)

Career NFL statistics
- Total tackles: 115
- Pass deflections: 3
- Stats at Pro Football Reference
- Stats at CFL.ca

Marquel Lee (born October 21, 1995) is an American professional football linebacker for the Calgary Stampeders of the Canadian Football League (CFL). He played college football at Wake Forest, and was selected by the Oakland Raiders in the fifth round of the 2017 NFL draft.

== Early life ==
Lee was born in Baltimore, Maryland, in 1995. His family moved to Waldorf, Maryland, and he attended Westlake High School.

== Professional career ==
=== Pre-draft ===
On December 14, 2016, it was announced that Lee had accepted his invitation to play in the 2017 East–West Shrine Game. During practice for the East–West Shrine Game, Lee sustained a foot injury and was unable to participate. He was one of 29 collegiate linebackers to attend the NFL Scouting Combine in Indianapolis, Indiana, but only performed the bench press, vertical jump, and broad jump due to his pre-existing foot injury. Lee performed well, finishing second among all linebackers in the bench press, 12th in the broad jump, and 16th in the vertical. On March 13, 2017, Lee attended Wake Forest's pro day and ran all of the combine drills he was unable to at the combine. At the conclusion of the pre-draft process, Lee was projected to be a fifth round pick by NFL draft experts and scouts. He was ranked the 13th best outside linebacker prospect in the draft by NFLDraftScout.com.

Pre-draft measurables
Height	Weight	Arm length	Hand span	Wingspan	40-yard dash	10-yard split	20-yard split	20-yard shuttle	Three-cone drill	Vertical jump	Broad jump	Bench press
6 ft 3 1/4 in (1.91 m)	240 lb (109 kg)	32 1/2 in (0.83 m)	9 1/2 in (0.24 m)	6 ft 6 1/8 in (1.98 m)	4.78 s	1.62 s	2.71 s	4.33 s	7.28 s	31.0 in (0.79 m)	9 ft 10 in (3.00 m)	25 reps
All values from NFL Combine/Wake Forest's Pro Day

=== Oakland Raiders ===
The Oakland Raiders selected Lee in the fifth round (168th overall) of the 2017 NFL draft. He was the 22nd linebacker selected in 2017.

On May 26, 2017, the Raiders signed Lee to a four-year, $2.65 million contract that includes a signing bonus of $253,963.

Throughout training camp, Lee competed for the starting middle linebacker role against Ben Heeney, Cory James, and Tyrell Adams. Head coach Jack Del Rio named him the starting middle linebacker to start the regular season.

He made his professional regular season debut and his first career start in the Raiders' season-opener at the Tennessee Titans and recorded two solo tackles during their 26–16 victory. On October 8, 2017, Lee recorded a season-high six combined tackles in a 30–17 loss to the Baltimore Ravens. He sustained an ankle injury during the game and was carted off the field to be examined in the locker room. He missed the next three games and lost his starting role to newly acquired veteran NaVorro Bowman who the Raiders signed on October 16, 2017. He finished his rookie season with 25 combined tackles (18 solo) in 13 games and six starts. Head coach Jack Del Rio was fired after the Raiders finished 6–10.

On September 24, 2019, Lee was placed on injured reserve. He was designated for return from injured reserve on November 11, 2019, and began practicing with the team again. He was activated on December 2, 2019. He was placed back on injured reserve on December 21, 2019.

Lee was placed on the active/physically unable to perform list at the start of training camp on July 28, 2020. He was waived with a failed physical designation on August 3, 2020.

=== Buffalo Bills (first stint) ===
Lee signed a one-year contract with the Buffalo Bills on March 31, 2021. He was released on August 31, 2021.

=== Las Vegas Raiders ===
On September 1, 2021, Lee was signed to the practice squad of the Las Vegas Raiders practice squad. He was promoted to the active roster on September 18, 2021. He was released on September 22, 2021, and re-signed to the practice squad. He was promoted back to the active roster on November 3.

=== Buffalo Bills (second stint) ===
On March 18, 2022, the Bills signed Lee to a one-year contract. He was released on August 16, 2022.

=== Arlington Renegades ===
On January 22, 2024, Lee signed with the Arlington Renegades of the United Football League (UFL).

=== Calgary Stampeders ===
On September 29, 2024, Lee signed with the Calgary Stampeders of the Canadian Football League (CFL). He played in three regular season games in 2024 where he had five defensive tackles and three special teams tackles. In 2025, Lee played in six regular season games, recording 26 defensive tackles. He changed his jersey number from 50 to 8 in the following offseason.
