= Cory James =

American football player (born 1993)

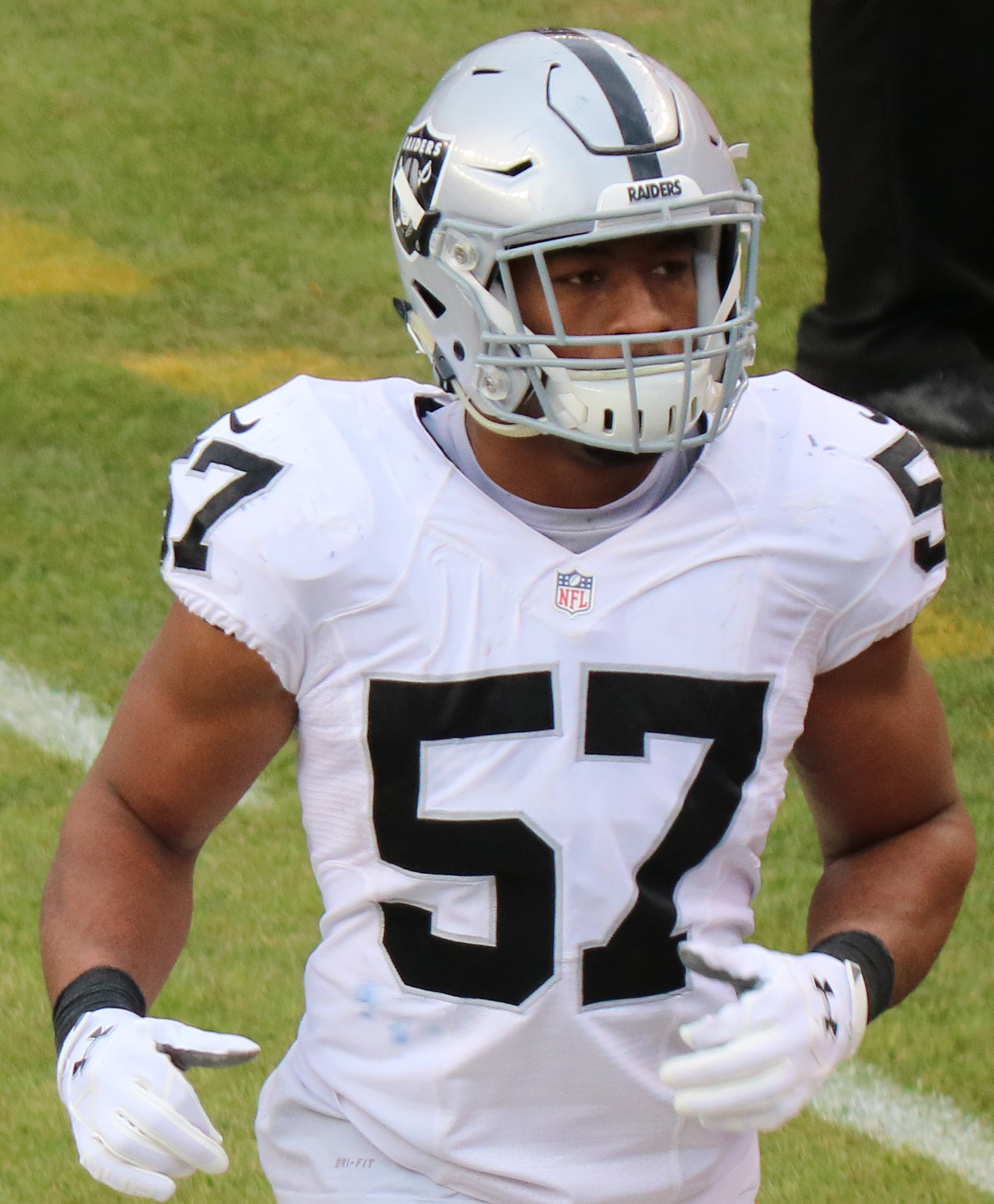
- James with the Oakland Raiders in 2016

No. 57
- Position: Linebacker

Personal information
- Born: May 22, 1993 (age 33); Del Rio, Texas, U.S.
- Listed height: 6 ft 1 in (1.85 m)
- Listed weight: 230 lb (104 kg)

Career information
- High school: Del Rio
- College: Colorado State
- NFL draft: 2016: 6th round, 194th overall pick

Career history
- Oakland Raiders (2016–2017); Calgary Stampeders (2020)

Awards and highlights
- Second-team All-Mountain West (2015)

Career NFL statistics
- Total tackles: 104
- Forced fumbles: 2
- Stats at Pro Football Reference

Cory Miguel James (born May 22, 1993) is an American former professional football player who was a linebacker in the National Football League (NFL). He played college football for the Colorado State Rams, and was selected by the Oakland Raiders in the sixth round of the 2016 NFL draft.

== Early life ==
James attended Del Rio High School, in Del Rio, Texas where he lettered twice in football. As a junior in 2009, he started all 13 games. As a senior in 2010, he started the first eight games before suffering a torn left anterior cruciate ligament (ACL). Before suffering the injury, he had recorded, combined as a junior and senior, 116 tackles, 26 tackles-for-loss, 11 sacks, three forced fumbles and one fumble recovery. Despite his injury, James was voted the District 29-5A Co-Linebacker of the Year as well as First-team All-District for the second consecutive year.

While at Del Rio High School, James also played on the schools baseball team. As a football player, he was recruited by TCU, New Mexico, Colorado, Texas State, Louisiana Tech and East Carolina Pirates football.

== College career ==
James then attended Colorado State where he majored in liberal arts.

In 2011, he redshirted, granting him a fifth year of eligibility. In 2012 as a redshirt freshman, he set a school record with 7.5 sacks. He finished the season with 54 tackles (26 solo) and 10.5 tackles-for-loss. He earned freshman All-America honors from the Football Writers Association of America and College Football News (Second-team), as well as Second-team national All-Freshman and Season team All-Mountain West by Phil Steele.

In 2013 as a redshirt sophomore, James started 13 games. He recorded 60 tackles (29 solo), eight sacks, 12 tackles-for-loss, one pass broken up, two forced fumbles and five quarterback hurries. In 2014 as a redshirt junior, appeared in all 13 games with 12 starts. He recorded 51 tackles (29 solo), a team leading 8.5 tackles-for-loss, 6.5 sacks, three quarterback hurries and once forced fumble. In 2015 as a redshirt senior, he appeared in all 13 games, starting 12. He recorded 65 tackles (28 solo), two sacks and 10 tackles-for-loss.

=== Statistics ===
Year	Team	GP/GS	Tackles				Sacks	Pass defense		Fumbles		Safeties	TDs
Year	Team	GP/GS	Solo	Ast	Total	TFL	No	Int	PD	FF	FR	Safeties	TDs
2011	Col. State	0 / 0	0	0	0	0	0	0	0	0	0	0	0
2012	Col. State	-- / --	27	27	54	11	7.5	0	1	1	0	0	0
2013	Col. State	13 / 13	29	30	59	12	8	0	1	2	0	0	0
2014	Col. State	13 / 12	30	21	51	8.5	6.5	0	1	1	0	0	0
2015	Col. State	13 / 12	28	37	65	10.0	2	0	0	0	0	0	0
Career		-- / --	114	115	229	41.5	24	0	3	4	0	0	0

== Professional career ==
Pre-draft measurables
Height	Weight	40-yard dash	10-yard split	20-yard split	20-yard shuttle	Three-cone drill	Vertical jump	Broad jump	Bench press
6 ft 0 in (1.83 m)	229 lb (104 kg)	4.60 s	1.63 s	2.68 s	4.50 s	6.65 s	35 in (0.89 m)	10 ft 7 in (3.23 m)	16 reps
All values from Colorado State pro day

=== Oakland Raiders ===
James was selected by the Oakland Raiders in the sixth round (194th overall) of the 2016 NFL draft. The Raiders previously traded linebacker Sio Moore to the Indianapolis Colts to obtain the selection used on James. On May 20, 2016, he signed a four-year contract worth $2,472,480, including a $132,480 signing bonus. He played in all 16 games with five starts, recording 48 tackles and one forced fumble.

James entered the 2017 season as one of the Raiders' starting outside linebackers. He started nine out of ten games played while dealing with a knee injury throughout the season. He missed two straight games before being placed on injured reserve on December 13, 2017 with the knee injury.

On May 4, 2018, James was waived by the Raiders with a failed physical designation.

=== Calgary Stampeders ===
James signed with the Calgary Stampeders of the Canadian Football League on March 31, 2020. He was released on July 29, 2021.

== Personal life ==
Cory James is the son of Clarence and Sheila James. He also has one older brother, Zachary James. While in college, James volunteered with the Boys & Girls Clubs of America in Larimer County, Colorado.
