= 2016 Oakland Raiders season =

57th season in franchise history; first playoff berth since 2002

- Owner: Mark Davis
- General manager: Reggie McKenzie
- Head coach: Jack Del Rio
- Home stadium: Oakland–Alameda County Coliseum

Results
- Record: 12–4
- Division place: 2nd AFC West
- Playoffs: Lost Wild Card Playoffs (at Texans) 14–27
- All-Pros: G/T Kelechi Osemele (1st team); LB Khalil Mack (1st team); P Marquette King (2nd team)
- Pro Bowlers: QB Derek Carr; WR Amari Cooper; C Rodney Hudson; LB Khalil Mack; FS Reggie Nelson; G/T Kelechi Osemele; T Donald Penn

Uniform
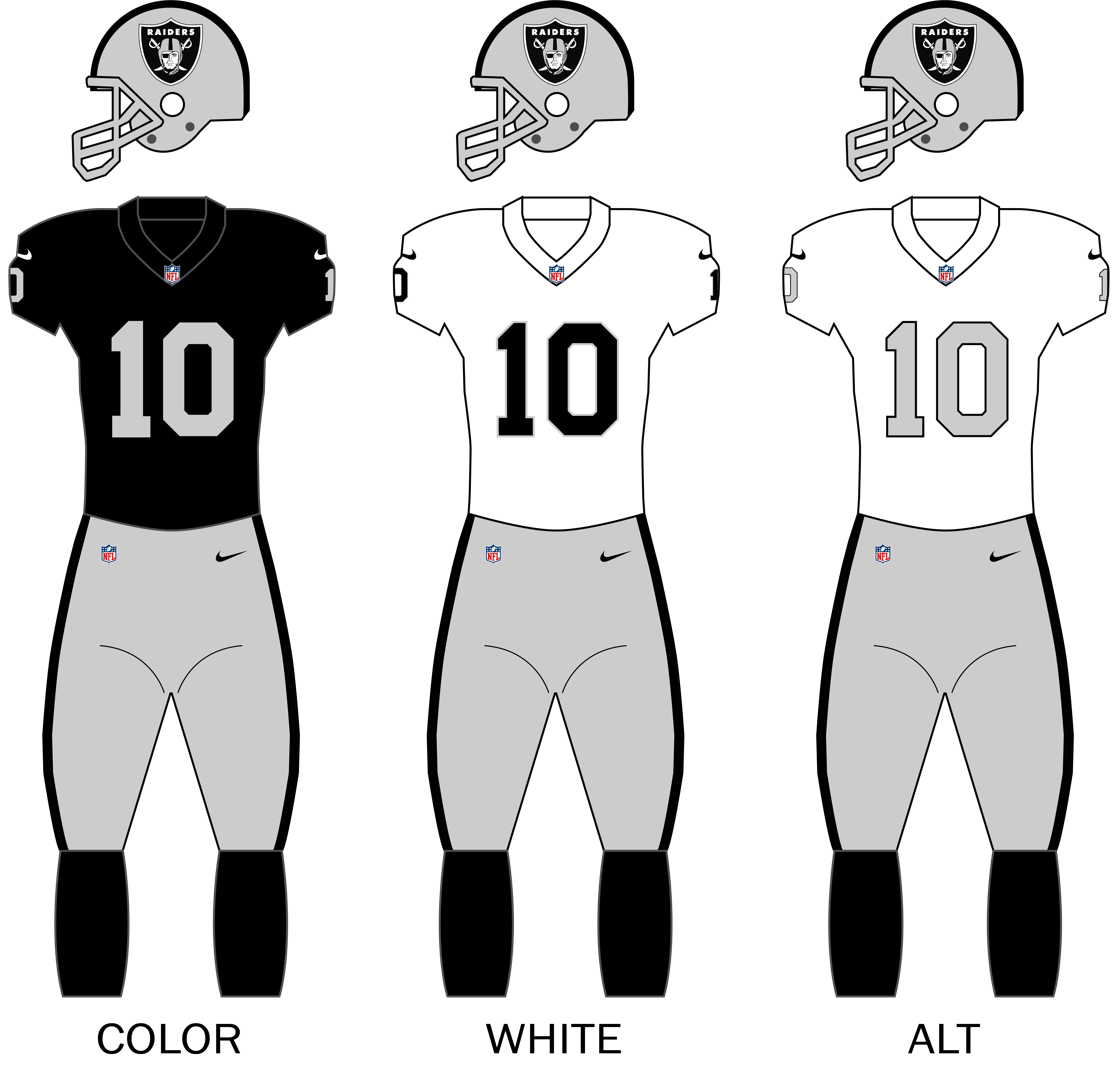

The 2016 season was the Oakland Raiders' 47th in the National Football League (NFL), their 57th overall, their 22nd since their return to Oakland, and their second under head coach Jack Del Rio. The Raiders improved on a 7–9 campaign in 2015 and finished with a winning record for the first time since 2002, finishing the regular season with a 12–4 record.

The Raiders, with their Week 15 win over the San Diego Chargers, clinched a playoff berth for the first time since 2002, ending their 14-year playoff drought. The Raiders finished the season tied with the Kansas City Chiefs for the AFC West division title, but lost the tiebreaker due to a head-to-head sweep.

In a Week 16 game against the Indianapolis Colts, Raiders quarterback Derek Carr sustained a broken fibula while being sacked by Trent Cole and missed the remainder of the season including the Raiders sole postseason game. Backup quarterback Matt McGloin started the final game of the season for Carr, but he had a shoulder injury during the game forcing rookie Connor Cook to play. Cook started the Wild Card playoff game against the Houston Texans, making him the first rookie in the Super Bowl era to make his very first NFL start in a playoff game. The Raiders were unable to win that game, falling to the Houston Texans 27–14. It was their first one-and-done playoff appearance since 1991 when they were based in Los Angeles.

On January 10, 2017, three days after the loss to the Texans, offensive coordinator Bill Musgrave's contract was not renewed.

Linebacker Khalil Mack was awarded Associated Press NFL Defensive Player of the Year Award at seasons end.

With the Raiders missing the playoffs following their season finale on December 29, 2019, this was the final time the Oakland-based Raiders qualified for the playoffs as they relocated to Las Vegas, Nevada starting in the 2020 NFL season. The Raiders would not make the playoffs again until the 2021 season when they lost to the Cincinnati Bengals in the AFC Wild Card Game, 26–19. This was the Raiders' only winning season from 2003 to 2020, as well as their last winning season during their Oakland-based days.

== Potential relocation ==
The Raiders' lease on the Oakland Alameda Coliseum (known as O.co Coliseum from 2011 through 2015) expired after the 2013 season; the team had spent the 2014 and 2015 seasons in the Coliseum on year-to-year leases. The franchise was subject to a possible relocation to Los Angeles, and the Raiders' 2016 season could have been the first in Los Angeles since 1994, had the team been approved to move there. On January 4, 2016, the team filed a formal relocation application, along with the San Diego Chargers, which was competing against a separate proposal by the St. Louis Rams to move to the Greater Los Angeles Area. The Raiders, despite their joint project with the Chargers earning the support of the Committee on Los Angeles Opportunities, did not receive enough support from the league as a whole for the relocation and withdrew its request to relocate to Los Angeles on January 12 after the Rams' proposal received a simple majority of votes.

The team also scouted the Alamodome in San Antonio, Texas as another potential relocation candidate in late 2014, before it began focusing on its failed Carson stadium proposal. Team officials then began conversing with officials from Las Vegas, Nevada regarding a potential future relocation there; in January 2016, Raiders owner Mark Davis met with Sheldon Adelson (Las Vegas Sands owner and CEO) about a proposed $1.3 billion, 65,000 seat domed stadium. On March 23, 2016, Davis met with Nevada Governor Brian Sandoval about moving his team to Las Vegas and recently on April 1, 2016, Mark Davis toured Sam Boyd Stadium whether it could serve as a temporary home and met UNLV coach Tony Sanchez, athletics director Tina Kunzer-Murphy, adviser Don Snyder, and university president Len Jessup about further exploring the possibility of the Raiders moving to Las Vegas. On April 28, 2016, Davis pledged to commit $500 million toward a new stadium in Las Vegas at a panel that included soccer superstar David Beckham, who was backing a proposed Major League Soccer franchise that would share the stadium with the Raiders and UNLV college football. The Raiders' proposal needed approval and funding from the Nevada State Legislature and, ostensibly, league approval to go forward (only ostensibly, since the Raiders have left Oakland without permission at least once before and won their case in court); the league indicated at the May 2016 owners' meetings that it would not object to the Raiders relocating. Davis stated on June 7 that the options for staying in Oakland had been exhausted for the time being and that he fully intended to relocate to Las Vegas in the long term, this despite a rumor that Commissioner Roger Goodell was attempting to undermine a move by orchestrating a counterproposal for an Oakland stadium in collaboration with Ronnie Lott.

If the team were willing to stay in the San Francisco Bay Area for 2016, they had the options of signing another short-term extension with the Coliseum or sub-leasing Levi's Stadium from the San Francisco 49ers. Davis opted to seek another one-year lease extension on the Coliseum, which he secured on February 11, keeping the Raiders in Oakland for another season while a long-term solution continued to be sought. The lease included team options for 2017 and 2018.

On September 15, 2016, the Southern Nevada Tourism Infrastructure Committee unanimously voted to approve and recommend $750 million for the Las Vegas stadium plan. Then on October 11, 2016, the Nevada State Senate voted 16–5 to approve the stadium funding bill and convention center expansion. Three days later, on October 14, the Nevada Assembly voted to approve funding for the stadium, 28–13. On October 18, Governor Brian Sandoval signed the stadium funding bill into law. This would lead to an eventual approval by the NFL after the season of the team's relocation to Las Vegas by 2020.

== Free agents signed ==
Pos.	Player	Age	2015 Team
LB	Bruce Irvin	28	Seattle Seahawks
OL	Kelechi Osemele	26	Baltimore Ravens
CB	Sean Smith	28	Kansas City Chiefs
S	Reggie Nelson	32	Cincinnati Bengals

== Draft ==
2016 Oakland Raiders Draft
Round	Selection	Player	Position	College
1	14	Karl Joseph	S	West Virginia
2	44	Jihad Ward	DE	Illinois
3	75	Shilique Calhoun	DE	Michigan State
4	100	Connor Cook	QB	Michigan State
5	143	DeAndré Washington	RB	Texas Tech
6	194	Cory James	LB	Colorado State
7	234	Vadal Alexander	G	LSU

Notes

- The Raiders traded wide receiver Brice Butler and their sixth-round selection to the Dallas Cowboys in exchange for the Cowboys' fifth-round selection. The selection swap would only occur if Butler is on the Cowboys' 2015 53-man roster for six games. On November 2, 2016, the trade was finalized as Butler appeared on the Cowboys' roster for the required amount of time.
- The Raiders acquired an additional sixth-round selection in a trade that sent linebacker Sio Moore to the Indianapolis Colts.

=== Undrafted free agents ===
After the draft, the Raiders signed the following undrafted free agents:

Position	Player	College
WR	K. J. Brent	Wake Forest
DE	James Cowser	Southern Utah
LB	Perez Ford	NIU
WR	Marvin Hall	Washington
DB	Antonio Hamilton	South Carolina State
WR	Johnny Holton	Cincinnati
WR	Pig Howard	Tennessee
DE	Drew Iddings	South Dakota
OL	Denver Kirkland	Arkansas
DT	Darius Latham	Indiana
WR	Max McCaffrey	Duke
CB	Tony McRae	North Carolina A&T
WR	Jaydon Mickens	Washington
TE	Ryan O'Malley	Penn
OL	Oni Omoile	Iowa State
RB	Jalen Richard	Southern Miss
LB	Ryan Simmons	Oklahoma State
DE	Greg Townsend Jr.	USC
OL	Terran Vaughn	Stephen F. Austin
LB	Kyrie Wilson	Fresno State

== Staff ==
2016 Oakland Raiders staff
Front office: Owner – Mark Davis; President – Marc Badain; Executive vice president/general counsel – Dan Ventrelle; General manager – Reggie McKenzie; Director of football administration – Tom Delaney; Director of player personnel – Joey Clinkscales; Director of pro personnel – Dane Van Der Nat; Director of college scouting – Shaun Herock; Head coaches: Head coach – Jack Del Rio; Offensive coaches: Offensive coordinator – Bill Musgrave; Quarterbacks – Todd Downing; Running backs – Bernie Parmalee; Wide receivers – Rob Moore; Tight ends – Bobby Johnson; Offensive line – Mike Tice; Assistant offensive line – Tim Holt; Senior offensive assistant – Jake Peetz; Offensive quality control – Nick Holz	Defensive coaches: Defensive coordinator – Ken Norton Jr.; Defensive line – Jethro Franklin; Linebackers – Sal Sunseri; Assistant linebackers – Brent Vieselmeyer; Defensive backs – Marcus Robertson; Assistant defensive backs – Rod Woodson; Defensive assistant – Sam Anno; Defensive quality control – Travis Smith; Special teams coaches: Special teams coordinator – Brad Seely; Assistant special teams – Tracy Smith; Strength and conditioning: Head strength and conditioning – Joe Gomes; Assistant strength and conditioning – Darryl Eto; Assistant strength and conditioning – Kevin Kijowski; Assistant strength and conditioning – Wesley Miller

== Final roster ==
2016 Oakland Raiders roster
Quarterbacks (QB): 4 Derek Carr; 8 Connor Cook; 14 Matt McGloin; Running backs (RB): 22 Taiwan Jones; 28 Latavius Murray; 49 Jamize Olawale FB; 30 Jalen Richard; 33 DeAndré Washington; Wide receivers (WR): 89 Amari Cooper; 15 Michael Crabtree; 18 Andre Holmes; 16 Johnny Holton; 10 Seth Roberts; Tight ends (TE): 81 Mychal Rivera; 88 Clive Walford	Offensive linemen (OL): 74 Vadal Alexander T/G; 76 Jon Feliciano C; 77 Austin Howard T; 61 Rodney Hudson C; 66 Gabe Jackson G; 79 Denver Kirkland G; 70 Kelechi Osemele G; 72 Donald Penn T; 71 Menelik Watson T; Defensive linemen (DL): 96 Denico Autry DE; 97 Mario Edwards Jr. DE; 78 Justin Ellis DT; 98 Branden Jackson DE; 75 Darius Latham DT; 52 Khalil Mack DE; 92 Stacy McGee DT; 95 Jihad Ward DE/DT; 90 Dan Williams DT	Linebackers (LB): 58 Tyrell Adams MLB; 56 Daren Bates OLB; 47 James Cowser OLB; 51 Bruce Irvin OLB; 57 Cory James MLB; 54 Perry Riley MLB; 53 Malcolm Smith OLB; Defensive backs (DB): 20 Nate Allen SS; 29 David Amerson CB; 38 T. J. Carrie CB; 32 Antonio Hamilton CB; 42 Karl Joseph SS; 23 Dexter McDonald CB; 39 Keith McGill SS; 27 Reggie Nelson FS; 21 Sean Smith CB; 41 Brynden Trawick FS; Special teams (ST): 59 Jon Condo LS; 11 Sebastian Janikowski K; 7 Marquette King P	Practice squad: 93 Jimmy Bean DE; 80 K. J. Brent WR; 94 Demetrius Cherry DT; 69 Takoby Cofield T (IR); 40 Kenneth Durden CB; 83 Cooper Helfet TE; 19 Jaydon Mickens WR; 85 Ryan O'Malley TE; 67 Oni Omoile G; 68 Ian Silberman G; Reserve: 41 Neiron Ball OLB (IR); 91 Shilique Calhoun OLB (IR); 30 SaQwan Edwards CB (IR); 25 D. J. Hayden CB (IR); 50 Ben Heeney MLB (IR); 82 Gabe Holmes TE (IR); 99 Aldon Smith OLB (Susp.); 86 Lee Smith TE (IR); Rookies in italics 53 active, 9 reserve, 9 practice squad

== Preseason ==
Week	Date	Opponent	Result	Record	Venue	Recap
1	August 12	at Arizona Cardinals	W 31–10	1–0	University of Phoenix Stadium	Recap
2	August 18	at Green Bay Packers	L 12–20	1–1	Lambeau Field	Recap
3	August 27	Tennessee Titans	L 14–27	1–2	Oakland–Alameda County Coliseum	Recap
4	September 1	Seattle Seahawks	L 21–23	1–3	Oakland–Alameda County Coliseum	Recap

== Regular season ==
=== Schedule ===
Week	Date	Opponent	Result	Record	Venue	Recap
1	September 11	at New Orleans Saints	**W** 35–34	1–0	Mercedes-Benz Superdome	Recap
2	September 18	Atlanta Falcons	**L** 28–35	1–1	Oakland–Alameda County Coliseum	Recap
3	September 25	at Tennessee Titans	**W** 17–10	2–1	Nissan Stadium	Recap
4	October 2	at Baltimore Ravens	**W** 28–27	3–1	M&T Bank Stadium	Recap
5	October 9	**San Diego Chargers**	**W** 34–31	4–1	Oakland–Alameda County Coliseum	Recap
6	October 16	**Kansas City Chiefs**	**L** 10–26	4–2	Oakland–Alameda County Coliseum	Recap
7	October 23	at Jacksonville Jaguars	**W** 33–16	5–2	EverBank Field	Recap
8	October 30	at Tampa Bay Buccaneers	**W** 30–24 (OT)	6–2	Raymond James Stadium	Recap
9	November 6	**Denver Broncos**	**W** 30–20	7–2	Oakland–Alameda County Coliseum	Recap
10	Bye					
11	November 21	Houston Texans	**W** 27–20	8–2	Estadio Azteca (Mexico City)	Recap
12	November 27	Carolina Panthers	**W** 35–32	9–2	Oakland–Alameda County Coliseum	Recap
13	December 4	Buffalo Bills	**W** 38–24	10–2	Oakland–Alameda County Coliseum	Recap
14	December 8	at **Kansas City Chiefs**	**L** 13–21	10–3	Arrowhead Stadium	Recap
15	December 18	at **San Diego Chargers**	**W** 19–16	11–3	Qualcomm Stadium	Recap
16	December 24	Indianapolis Colts	**W** 33–25	12–3	Oakland–Alameda County Coliseum	Recap
17	January 1	at **Denver Broncos**	**L** 6–24	12–4	Sports Authority Field at Mile High	Recap

Note: Intra-division opponents are in bold text.

=== Game summaries ===
==== Week 1: at New Orleans Saints ====
Week One: Oakland Raiders at New Orleans Saints – Game summary

Quarter	1	2	3	4	Total
**Raiders**	10	0	3	22	**35**
Saints	3	14	7	10	**34**

at Mercedes-Benz Superdome, New Orleans, Louisiana

- Date: September 11
- Game time: 12:00 p.m. CDT/10:00 a.m. PDT
- Game weather: Played indoors (dome stadium)
- Game attendance: 73,028
- Referee: John Parry
- TV announcers (Fox): Chris Myers, Ronde Barber and Jennifer Hale
- Recap, Gamebook

Game information

**First quarter**

- OAK – Sebastian Janikowski 47-yard field goal, 12:23. Raiders 3–0. **Drive: 4 plays, −8 yards, 2:22.**
- NO – Wil Lutz 42-yard field goal, 6:31. Tied 3–3. **Drive: 13 plays, 65 yards, 5:52.**
- OAK – Latavius Murray 6-yard run (Sebastian Janikowski kick), 1:43. Raiders 10–3. **Drive: 7 plays, 91 yards, 4:48.**

**Second quarter**

- NO – Willie Snead 1-yard pass from Drew Brees (Wil Lutz kick), 11:57. Tied 10–10. **Drive: 9 plays, 75 yards, 4:46.**
- NO – Brandin Cooks 15-yard pass from Drew Brees (Wil Lutz kick), 4:55. Saints 17–10. **Drive: 8 plays, 80 yards, 4:06.**

**Third quarter**

- NO – Brandin Cooks 98-yard pass from Drew Brees (Wil Lutz kick), 7:52. Saints 24–10. **Drive: 1 play, 98 yards, 0:11.**
- OAK – Sebastian Janikowski 31-yard field goal, 3:11. Saints 24–13. **Drive: 12 plays, 62 yards, 4:41.**

**Fourth quarter**

- OAK – Jamize Olawale 2-yard run (pass failed), 11:53. Saints 24–19. **Drive: 4 plays, 60 yards, 1:49.**
- NO – Wil Lutz 20-yard field goal, 8:42. Saints 27–19. **Drive: 6 plays, 69 yards, 3:11.**
- OAK – Jalen Richard 75-yard run (Derek Carr–Amari Cooper pass), 8:26. Tied 27–27. **Drive: 2 plays, 75 yards, 0:16.**
- NO – Travaris Cadet 2-yard pass from Drew Brees (Wil Lutz kick), 6:03. Saints 34–27. **Drive: 3 plays, 84 yards, 2:23.**
- OAK – Seth Roberts 10-yard pass from Derek Carr (Derek Carr–Michael Crabtree pass), 0:47. Raiders 35–34. **Drive: 11 plays, 75 yards, 5:16.**

**Top passers**

- OAK – Derek Carr – 24/38, 319 yards, TD
- NO – Drew Brees – 28/42, 423 yards, 4 TD

**Top rushers**

- OAK – Jalen Richard – 3 rushes, 84 yards, TD
- NO – Mark Ingram II – 12 rushes, 58 yards

**Top receivers**

- OAK – Amari Cooper – 8 receptions, 137 yards
- NO – Willie Snead 9 receptions, 172 yards, TD

In a high scoring affair, the Raiders took an early lead on a Sebastian Janikowski field goal and a Latavius Murray touchdown run, leading at the end of the first, 10–3. The Saints answered and took a half time lead on two touchdown passes by Drew Brees, 17–10. A 98-yard pass and catch from Brees to Brandin Cooks early in the third quarter put the Saints up by 14. However, the Raiders roared back, scoring 17 of the next 20 points with two rushing touchdowns, including a 75-yard run by rookie Jalen Richard on his first career carry to tie the game at 27 with eight minutes remaining in the game. However, Brees kept his tremendous game going as the Raiders were unable to stop him on the day throwing his fourth touchdown of the game to put the Saints back on top 34–27. The Raiders answered with a touchdown pass from Derek Carr to Seth Roberts with 47 seconds remaining. Coach Jack Del Rio opted to try for the two point conversion instead of trying to stop Brees in an overtime period and Carr hit Michael Crabtree for the conversion to put the Raiders up 35–34. The Saints had time to attempt a 61-yard field goal by rookie kicker Wil Lutz, but the kick was wide right. The Raiders moved to 1–0 on the season as they won their season opener for the first time since 2011.

==== Week 2: vs. Atlanta Falcons ====
Week Two: Atlanta Falcons at Oakland Raiders – Game summary

Quarter	1	2	3	4	Total
**Falcons**	0	13	8	14	**35**
Raiders	0	7	7	14	**28**

at Oakland Alameda Coliseum, Oakland, California

- Date: September 18
- Game time: 1:25 p.m. PDT
- Game weather: 79 °F (26 °C), sunny
- Game attendance: 54,081
- Referee: Clete Blakeman
- TV announcers (CBS): Kevin Harlan and Rich Gannon
- Recap, Gamebook

Game information

**First quarter**

- No scoring plays

**Second quarter**

- ATL – Matt Bryant 21-yard field goal, 11:58. Falcons 3–0. **Drive: 11 plays, 88 yards, 4:55.**
- OAK – Latavius Murray 1-yard run (Sebastian Janikowski kick), 7:51. Raiders 7–3. **Drive: 7 plays, 91 yards, 4:07.**
- ATL – Julio Jones 21-yard pass from Matt Ryan (Matt Bryant kick), 4:46. Falcons 10–7. **Drive: 10 plays, 75 yards, 3:05.**
- ATL – Matt Bryant 20-yard field goal, 0:38. Falcons 13–7. **Drive: 4 plays, 7 yards, 0:55.**

**Third quarter**

- OAK – Clive Walford 31-yard pass from Derek Carr (Sebastian Janikowski kick), 11:17. Raiders 14–13. **Drive: 8 plays, 81 yards, 3:43.**
- ATL – Jacob Tamme 14-yard pass from Matt Ryan (Matt Ryan run), 3:42. Falcons 21–14. **Drive: 5 plays, 85 yards, 1:54.**

**Fourth quarter**

- OAK – Michael Crabtree 2-yard pass from Derek Carr (Sebastian Janikowski kick), 12:00. Tied 21–21. **Drive: 13 plays, 75 yards, 6:42.**
- ATL – Justin Hardy 13-yard run (Matt Bryant kick), 9:29. Falcons 28–21. **Drive: 6 plays, 75 yards, 2:31.**
- ATL – Tevin Coleman 13-yard run (Matt Bryant kick), 4:35. Falcons 35–21. **Drive: 5 plays, 50 yards, 2:37.**
- OAK – Andre Holmes 6-yard pass from Derek Carr (Sebastian Janikowski kick), 2:12. Falcons 35–28. **Drive: 8 plays, 75 yards, 2:23.**

**Top passers**

- ATL – Matt Ryan – 26/34, 396 yards, 3 TD, INT
- OAK – Derek Carr – 34/45, 299 yards, 3 TD

**Top rushers**

- ATL – Devonta Freeman – 17 rushes, 93 yards
- OAK – Latavius Murray – 8 rushes, 57 yards, TD

**Top receivers**

- ATL – Julio Jones – 5 receptions, 106 yards, TD
- OAK – Amari Cooper – 5 receptions, 71 yards

The Raiders looked to win their home opener and extend their record to 2–0 for the first time since 2002. But, the Atlanta offense and Raider defense, or lack thereof, would have a say in the game. Neither team could score in the first quarter and the Falcons took an early lead on field goal in the second. However, Latavius Murray answered with a 1-yard touchdown run to put the Raiders in front 7–3. The Falcons surged back to take a halftime lead on a 21-yard touchdown pass to Julio Jones and another field goal. At half, the Raiders trailed 13–7. In the second half, the Raiders retook the lead as Derek Carr hit Clive Walford on a 31-yard touchdown pass. Before the quarter ended, the Falcons answered on a 14-yard touchdown pass from Matt Ryan and a Ryan rush for two points to take a 21–14 lead into the fourth quarter. The Raiders tied it on a two-yard pass from Carr to Michael Crabtree, but the Falcons answered again with the help of a tipped Ryan pass that landed in the arms of Justin Hardy for another Falcon touchdown. Trailing 28–21, the Raiders thought they had tied it up again on a 51-yard touchdown pass from Carr to Amari Cooper, but officials ruled that he had gone out of bounds voluntarily before catching the ball. Head coach Jack Del Rio gambled shortly thereafter on a fourth and two which failed and led to another touchdown for the Falcons, a 13-yard run by Tevin Coleman. Trailing 35–21, the Raiders were able to bring it closer on an Andre Holmes six-yard touchdown reception, but the Falcons salted the game away and won 35–28. The Raiders defense allowed 528 yards of offense, the first team since the 1967 Falcons to give up at least 500 yards in the first two games of the season. The Raiders fell to 1–1.

==== Week 3: at Tennessee Titans ====
Week Three: Oakland Raiders at Tennessee Titans – Game summary

Quarter	1	2	3	4	Total
**Raiders**	7	10	0	0	**17**
Titans	3	0	7	0	**10**

at Nissan Stadium, Nashville, Tennessee

- Date: September 25
- Game time: 12:00 p.m. CDT/10:00 a.m. PDT
- Game weather: 89 °F (32 °C), sunny
- Game attendance: 62,370
- Referee: Tony Corrente
- TV announcers (CBS): Andrew Catalon, Steve Beuerlein and Steve Tasker
- Recap, Gamebook

Game information

**First quarter**

- TEN – Ryan Succop 34-yard field goal, 9:50. Titans 3–0. **Drive: 10 plays, 59 yards, 5:10.**
- OAK – Latavius Murray 22-yard run (Sebastian Janikowski kick), 8:19. Raiders 7–3. **Drive: 5 plays, 60 yards, 1:31.**

**Second quarter**

- OAK – Sebastian Janikowski 52-yard field goal, 8:13. Raiders 10–3. **Drive: 4 plays, −9 yards, 1:07.**
- OAK – Seth Roberts 19-yard pass from Derek Carr (Sebastian Janikowski kick), 0:33. Raiders 17–3. **Drive: 8 plays, 91 yards, 3:44.**

**Third quarter**

- TEN – DeMarco Murray 5-yard run (Ryan Succop kick), 5:51. Raiders 17–10. **Drive: 7 plays, 93 yards, 3:54.**

**Fourth quarter**

- No scoring plays

**Top passers**

- OAK – Derek Carr – 21/35, 249 yards, TD, INT
- TEN – Marcus Mariota – 17/33, 214 yards, 2 INT

**Top rushers**

- OAK – DeAndré Washington – 6 rushes, 57 yards
- TEN – DeMarco Murray – 16 rushes, 114 yards, TD

**Top receivers**

- OAK – Michael Crabtree – 8 receptions, 102 yards
- TEN – Jace Amaro – 3 receptions, 59 yards

The Raiders traveled to Tennessee looking to shore up their defense that had allowed 500 yards in each of the first two games of the season. The defense responded, forcing three Titan turnovers and holding the Titans to only one touchdown and 393 yards of offense on the day. Latavius Murray scored a touchdown for the third consecutive game, giving the Raiders a lead on their first drive, jumping in front of the Titans 7–3. The Raiders took over in the second quarter, scoring a touchdown on a 19-yard pass from Derek Carr to Seth Roberts and on Sebastian Janikowski's record-setting 52-yard field goal which marked the most field goals over 50 yards by any one player. Titans quarterback, Marcus Mariota, was intercepted on the final play of the first half by Reggie Nelson and the Raiders took a 17–3 halftime lead. DeMarco Murray brought the Titans within seven in the third quarter, scoring on a five-yard run. The Raiders defense held strong for the rest of the half, intercepting Mariota again late in the third quarter. However, the Raiders offense mustered zero points in the second half and, as a result, the Titans had a chance to tie the game late in the fourth quarter. Mariota hit Tajae Sharpe to get to the Raiders three-yard line with just over a minute remaining. However, Titan offensive lineman Taylor Lewan was called for unnecessary roughness for jumping on the pile after the play. The Titans were pushed back 15 yards, but Mariota hit Andre Johnson two plays later for an apparent touchdown, but Johnson was called for pass interference on the play and the touchdown was taken off the board. On fourth down with 16 seconds remaining, Mariota could not hit Harry Douglas in the endzone and the Raiders pulled out the victory. The win moved the Raiders to 2–1 on the season.

==== Week 4: at Baltimore Ravens ====
Week Four: Oakland Raiders at Baltimore Ravens – Game summary

Quarter	1	2	3	4	Total
**Raiders**	7	7	0	14	**28**
Ravens	0	6	6	15	**27**

at M&T Bank Stadium, Baltimore, Maryland

- Date: October 2
- Game time: 1:00 p.m. EDT/10:00 a.m. PDT
- Game weather: 65 °F (18 °C), cloudy
- Game attendance: 71,152
- Referee: Ed Hochuli
- TV announcers (CBS): Andrew Catalon, Steve Beuerlein, Steve Tasker and Chris Fischer
- Recap, Gamebook

Game information

**First quarter**

- OAK – Seth Roberts 6-yard pass from Derek Carr (Sebastian Janikowski kick), 1:25. Raiders 7–0. **Drive: 1 play, 6 yards, 0:07.**

**Second quarter**

- BAL – Justin Tucker 24-yard field goal, 12:51. Raiders 7–3. **Drive: 9 plays, 42 yards, 3:34.**
- OAK – Michael Crabtree 5-yard pass from Derek Carr (Sebastian Janikowski kick), 4:09. Raiders 14–3. **Drive: 9 plays, 80 yards, 4:00.**
- BAL – Justin Tucker 43-yard field goal, 0:03. Raiders 14–6. **Drive: 10 plays, 63 yards, 1:34.**

**Third quarter**

- BAL – Joe Flacco 1-yard run (pass failed), 2:41. Raiders 14–12. **Drive: 13 plays, 72 yards, 7:00.**

**Fourth quarter**

- OAK – Michael Crabtree 13-yard pass from Derek Carr (Sebastian Janikowski kick), 11:11. Raiders 21–12. **Drive: 6 plays, 29 yards, 3:37.**
- BAL – Steve Smith Sr. 52-yard pass from Joe Flacco (Justin Tucker kick), 6:27. Raiders 21–19. **Drive: 1 play, 52 yards, 0:11.**
- BAL – Terrance West 3-yard run (Joe Flacco–Mike Wallace pass), 3:36. Ravens 27–21. **Drive: 4 plays, 17 yards, 1:59.**
- OAK – Michael Crabtree 23-yard pass from Derek Carr (Sebastian Janikowski kick), 2:12. Raiders 28–27. **Drive: 6 plays, 66 yards, 1:24.**

**Top passers**

- OAK – Derek Carr – 25/35, 199 yards, 4 TD
- BAL – Joe Flacco – 32/52, 298 yards, TD

**Top rushers**

- OAK – DeAndré Washington – 5 rushes, 30 yards
- BAL – Terrance West – 21 rushes, 113 yards, TD

**Top receivers**

- OAK – Michael Crabtree – 7 receptions, 88 yards, 3 TD
- BAL – Steve Smith Sr. – 8 receptions, 111 yards, TD

The Raiders traveled to Baltimore looking to win their third straight road game to open the season for the first time since 2000. The Ravens, undefeated on the season, looked to continue their good start. The Raiders jumped out early, taking a lead on a six-yard touchdown pass to Seth Roberts from Derek Carr. A Baltimore field goal tightened the lead before Carr hit Michael Crabtree for his first of three touchdown scores on the day, and the Raiders took a 14–6 lead to the half as the Raiders defense held the Ravens in check. Baltimore answered in the third quarter, pulling within two on a Joe Flacco one-yard touchdown run. Crabtree again answered for the Raiders on a 13-yard pass from Carr. However, the Raiders defense allowed a 52-yard pass and catch from Flacco to Steve Smith Sr. and the Ravens pulled within two after failing to convert on the two-point conversion. The Raiders lead tightened to 21–19. The Ravens struck again following a fumble by Raiders rookie running back DeAndré Washington and Terrance West scored three-yard touchdown run to take the Ravens first lead of the game 27–21. The Raiders answered, driving down the field before Carr hit Crabtree from 23 yards out. The Raiders took the lead 28–27. As time was running out, the Ravens looked for the game-winning field goal, but the Raiders defense held and the Raiders moved to 3–1 for the first time since 2000. The three-touchdown game marked Crabtree's first career three-touchdown game. Carr finished with four touchdowns on 199 yards passing. The Raiders defense, much maligned on the season, gave up 412 yards, but stopped the Ravens when needed.

With the win, the Raiders recorded their first road victory against the Ravens and their first win in Baltimore since defeating the Baltimore Colts 37–31 in double overtime during the AFC Divisional Playoff Game in the 1977–78 NFL playoffs.

==== Week 5: vs. San Diego Chargers ====
Week Five: San Diego Chargers at Oakland Raiders – Game summary

Quarter	1	2	3	4	Total
Chargers	0	10	14	7	**31**
**Raiders**	3	6	18	7	**34**

at Oakland Alameda Coliseum, Oakland, California

- Date: October 9
- Game time: 1:25 p.m. PDT
- Game weather: 75 °F (24 °C), sunny
- Game attendance: 54,275
- Referee: Gene Steratore
- TV announcers (CBS): Tom McCarthy and Adam Archuleta
- Recap, Gamebook

Game information

**First quarter**

- OAK – Sebastian Janikowski 20-yard field goal, 4:00. Raiders 3–0. **Drive: 16 plays, 87 yards, 8:01.**

**Second quarter**

- SD – Tyrell Williams 29-yard pass from Philip Rivers (Josh Lambo kick), 13:07. Chargers 7–3. **Drive: 8 plays, 60 yards, 3:20.**
- OAK – Sebastian Janikowski 26-yard field goal, 7:13. Chargers 7–6. **Drive: 11 plays, 67 yards, 5:54.**
- SD – Josh Lambo 36-yard field goal, 4:24. Chargers 10–6. **Drive: 5 plays, 57 yards, 2:249.**
- OAK – Sebastian Janikowski 56-yard field goal, 0:00. Chargers 10–9. **Drive: 4 plays, 6 yards, 1:39.**

**Third quarter**

- SD – Melvin Gordon 18-yard pass from Philip Rivers (Josh Lambo kick), 12:31. Chargers 17–9. **Drive: 4 plays, 75 yards, 2:29.**
- OAK – Amari Cooper 64-yard pass from Derek Carr (Sebastian Janikowski kick), 11:25. Chargers 17–16. **Drive: 5 plays, 75 yards, 1:06.**
- SD – Hunter Henry 1-yard pass from Philip Rivers (Josh Lambo kick), 10:10. Chargers 24–16. **Drive: 3 plays, 75 yards, 1:15.**
- OAK – Sebastian Janikowski 48-yard field goal, 4:41. Chargers 24–19. **Drive: 10 plays, 45 yards, 5:29.**
- OAK – Michael Crabtree 21-yard pass from Derek Carr (Derek Carr–Amari Cooper pass), 1:09. Raiders 27–24. **Drive: 6 plays, 38 yards, 2:45.**

**Fourth quarter**

- OAK – Jamize Olawale 1-yard run (Sebastian Janikowski kick), 12:51. Raiders 34–24. **Drive: 4 plays, 32 yards, 2:09.**
- SD – Antonio Gates 4-yard pass from Philip Rivers (Josh Lambo kick), 6:21. Raiders 34–31. **Drive: 12 plays, 75 yards, 6:30.**

**Top passers**

- SD – Philip Rivers – 21/30, 359 yards, 4 TD, 2 INT
- OAK – Derek Carr – 25/40, 317 yards, 2 TD, INT

**Top rushers**

- SD – Melvin Gordon – 16 rushes, 69 yards
- OAK – Jalen Richard – 8 rushes, 31 yards

**Top receivers**

- SD – Tyrell Williams – 5 receptions, 117 yards, TD
- OAK – Amari Cooper – 6 receptions, 138 yards, TD

The Raiders returned home to face the San Diego Chargers in their first division game of the season. However, the Raiders offense struggled to score early, unable to score a touchdown on three offensive possessions in Charger territory in the first half and turning the ball over early. Derek Carr was picked on the fourth play from scrimmage, setting up the Chargers for a chance to take an early lead. However, the Raiders defense forced a fumble and prevented the Chargers from scoring. The Raiders offense could not take advantage, only managing three field goals in the first half by Sebastian Janikowski, however he missed a fourth attempt. Tyrell Williams scored for the Chargers on a 29-yard pass from Philip Rivers and the Chargers took a 10–9 lead into the half. In the second half, the Chargers took a 17–9 lead on Melvin Gordon reception from Rivers. The Raiders answered on a 64-yard pitch and catch from Carr to Amari Cooper, his first touchdown catch of the year. However, the Raiders defense continued its struggles, giving up another touchdown pass from Rivers to Hunter Henry as the Raiders fell behind 24–16. A 48-yard field goal by Janikowski brought the Raiders within five before the Raider defense garnered its third turnover of the game, forcing a Gordon fumble. The Raider offense struggled in response and were left with a fourth and two from the Charger 21-yard line. Continuing with the season's gutsy calls, head coach Jack Del Rio went for it and Carr found Michael Crabtree for a diving catch in the corner of the endzone to give the Raiders their first lead of the game. The Raiders added on from there, scoring a touchdown on a Jamize Olawale one-yard run seemingly salting the game away, 34–24. However, the Raider defense allowed the Chargers to move within three on a 76-yard drive capped by an Antonio Gates touchdown catch. Trailing 34–31, the Chargers again moved into Raider territory in the waning seconds of the fourth quarter. Forced to attempt a game-tying field goal, the Chargers fumbled the snap and the Raiders were able to run out the clock. Moving to 4–1 on the season, the first time since 2002, the Raider defense still surrendered over 400 yards for the fourth time in five games this season. Del Rio was angered by the continued poor defensive showing. Despite this and combined with a loss by the Denver Broncos, the Raiders moved into a tie for first place in the AFC West.

==== Week 6: vs. Kansas City Chiefs ====
Week Six: Kansas City Chiefs at Oakland Raiders – Game summary

Quarter	1	2	3	4	Total
**Chiefs**	7	6	10	3	**26**
Raiders	7	3	0	0	**10**

at Oakland Alameda Coliseum, Oakland, California

- Date: October 16
- Game time: 1:05 p.m. PDT
- Game weather: 61 °F (16 °C), rain
- Game attendance: 54,211
- Referee: Pete Morelli
- TV announcers (CBS): Kevin Harlan and Rich Gannon
- Recap, Gamebook

Game information

**First quarter**

- OAK – Andre Holmes 3-yard pass from Derek Carr (Sebastian Janikowski kick), 11:58. Raiders 7–0. **Drive: 7 plays, 46 yards, 3:02.**
- KC – Spencer Ware 2-yard run (Cairo Santos kick), 2:16. Tied 7–7. **Drive: 10 plays, 57 yards, 5:27.**

**Second quarter**

- KC – Jamaal Charles 4-yard run (kick failed, wide right), 7:11. Chiefs 13–7. **Drive: 6 plays, 58 yards, 3:18.**
- OAK – Sebastian Janikowski 46-yard field goal, 0:00. Chiefs 13–10. **Drive: 5 plays, 44 yards, 0:25.**

**Third quarter**

- KC – Dontari Poe 1-yard run (Cairo Santos kick), 11:37. Chiefs 20–10. **Drive: 7 plays, 75 yards, 3:23.**
- KC – Cairo Santos 22-yard field goal, 7:48. Chiefs 23–10. **Drive: 5 plays, 32 yards, 2:47.**

**Fourth quarter**

- KC – Cairo Santos 44-yard field goal, 9:51. Chiefs 26–10. **Drive: 11 plays, 52 yards, 5:32.**

**Top passers**

- KC – Alex Smith – 19/22, 224 yards
- OAK – Derek Carr – 22/34, 225 yards, TD, INT

**Top rushers**

- KC – Spencer Ware – 24 rushes, 131 yards, TD
- OAK – DeAndré Washington – 10 rushes, 49 yards

**Top receivers**

- KC – Jeremy Maclin – 3 receptions, 49 yards
- OAK – Amari Cooper – 10 receptions, 129 yards

Following the Denver Broncos loss on Thursday night to the San Diego Chargers, the Raiders looked to move into sole possession of first place in the AFC West as they hosted the Kansas City Chiefs. Things began well for the Raiders as Jalen Richard returned the opening kick 50 yards and Derek Carr hit Andre Holmes for a three-yard touchdown pass to put the Raiders up 7–0. However, the struggling Raiders defense continued to have problems stopping opponents as the Chiefs scored on a two-yard touchdown run by Spencer Ware and a four-yard run by Jamaal Charles (extra point failed), putting the Chiefs in front 13–7. The Raiders were able to get a field goal from Sebastian Janikowski as the half ended to pull within 13–10. However, Chiefs head coach Andy Reid, who is 16–2 in his career coming off of bye weeks, continued to baffle the Raiders defense in the second half. The Chiefs added a one-yard run by defensive lineman Dontari Poe and two field goals by Cairo Santos to go up 26–10. The Raiders offense managed nothing in the second half and the Chiefs won 26–10. The Chiefs offense put up 406 yards on the hapless Raiders defense. The Raiders fell to 4–2 on the season and back into a first place tie with the Broncos.

==== Week 7: at Jacksonville Jaguars ====
Week Seven: Oakland Raiders at Jacksonville Jaguars – Game summary

Quarter	1	2	3	4	Total
**Raiders**	3	17	3	10	**33**
Jaguars	0	6	3	7	**16**

at EverBank Field, Jacksonville, Florida

- Date: October 23
- Game time: 1:00 p.m. EDT/10:00 a.m. EDT
- Game weather: 70 °F (21 °C), sunny
- Game attendance: 62,614
- Referee: Jeff Triplette
- TV announcers (CBS): Greg Gumbel, Trent Green and Jamie Erdahl
- Recap, Gamebook

Game information

**First quarter**

- OAK – Sebastian Janikowski 26-yard field goal, 9:06. Raiders 3–0. **Drive: 9 plays, 63 yards, 3:15.**

**Second quarter**

- OAK – Sebastian Janikowski 32-yard field goal, 14:52. Raiders 6–0. **Drive: 4 plays, 3 yards, 0:12.**
- JAX – Jason Myers 23-yard field goal, 12:38. Raiders 6–3. **Drive: 5 plays, 70 yards, 2:08.**
- OAK – Latavius Murray 2-yard run (Sebastian Janikowski kick), 5:32. Raiders 13–3. **Drive: 11 plays, 75 yards, 7:06.**
- JAX – Jason Myers 37-yard field goal, 1:49. Raiders 13–6. **Drive: 9 plays, 56 yards, 3:43.**
- OAK – Michael Crabtree 2-yard pass from Derek Carr (Sebastian Janikowski kick), 0:11. Raiders 20–6. **Drive: 7 plays, 75 yards, 1:38.**

**Third quarter**

- JAX – Jason Myers 44-yard field goal, 12:11. Raiders 20–9. **Drive: 7 plays, 39 yards, 2:49.**
- OAK – Sebastian Janikowski 44-yard field goal, 2:28. Raiders 23–9. **Drive: 5 plays, 12 yards, 2:17.**

**Fourth quarter**

- OAK – Sebastian Janikowski 52-yard field goal, 11:33. Raiders 26–9. **Drive: 6 plays, 38 yards, 3:44.**
- JAX – Julius Thomas 9-yard pass from Blake Bortles (Jason Myers kick), 4:12. Raiders 26–16. **Drive: 11 plays, 83 yards, 3:03.**
- OAK – Latavius Murray 9-yard run (Sebastian Janikowski kick), 2:35. Raiders 33–16. **Drive: 8 plays, 48 yards, 1:37.**

**Top passers**

- OAK – Derek Carr – 23/27, 200 yards, TD
- JAX – Blake Bortles – 23/43, 246 yards, TD, 2 INT

**Top rushers**

- OAK – Latavius Murray – 18 rushes, 59 yards, 2 TD
- JAX – Chris Ivory – 5 rushes, 48 yards

**Top receivers**

- OAK – Michael Crabtree – 8 receptions, 96 yards, TD
- JAX – Marqise Lee – 7 receptions, 107 yards

The Raiders traveled to Jacksonville looking to make up for their disappointing performance in Week 6 against Kansas City and to improve their road record to 4–0. This would be head coach Jack Del Rio's first return to Jacksonville in 5 years, as he previously served as their head coach from 2003 to 2011. Latavius Murray, making his first appearance since Week 4, scored two touchdowns for the Raiders, including the first touchdown of the game to add to a Raiders lead of 6–3 following two Sebastian Janikowski field goals. A five-yard touchdown pass from Derek Carr to Michael Crabtree before the half ended put the Raiders up comfortably, 20–6. The touchdown pass followed a Carr to Crabtree 52-yard pass to set up the touchdown. Janikowski added two more field goals in the second half making four for the game. Murray scored his second touchdown of the game following a fourth and 24 conversion by Raiders punter Marquette King who fielded a low snap and scampered for 27 yards and a first down. The Raiders defense improved their performance and intercepted Blake Bortles twice to secure the victory. Jack Del Rio gained a victory against his former team and the win moved the Raiders to 5–2 for the first time since 2001.

==== Week 8: at Tampa Bay Buccaneers ====
Week Eight: Oakland Raiders at Tampa Bay Buccaneers – Game summary

Quarter	1	2	3	4	OT	Total
**Raiders**	0	3	14	7	6	**30**
Buccaneers	3	7	0	14	0	**24**

at Raymond James Stadium, Tampa, Florida

- Date: October 30
- Game time: 1:00 p.m. EDT/10:00 a.m. PDT
- Game weather: 86 °F (30 °C), clear
- Game attendance: 61,068
- Referee: Terry McAulay
- TV announcers (CBS): Andrew Catalon, Steve Beuerlein, Steve Tasker and Chris Fischer
- Recap, Gamebook

Game information

**First quarter**

- TB – Roberto Aguayo 41-yard field goal, 3:59. Buccaneers 3–0. **Drive: 12 plays, 67 yards, 6:31.**

**Second quarter**

- TB – Russell Shepard 19-yard pass from Jameis Winston (Roberto Aguayo kick), 15:00. Buccaneers 10–0. **Drive: 3 plays, 34 yards, 1:21.**
- OAK – Sebastian Janikowski 31-yard field goal, 8:19. Buccaneers 10–3. **Drive: 5 plays, 58 yards, 2:06.**

**Third quarter**

- OAK – Donald Penn 1-yard pass from Derek Carr (Sebastian Janikowski kick), 10:30. Tied 10–10. **Drive: 8 plays, 75 yards, 4:36.**
- OAK – Amari Cooper 34-yard pass from Derek Carr (Sebastian Janikowski kick, 5:38. Raiders 17–10. **Drive: 7 plays, 67 yards, 3:43.**

**Fourth quarter**

- TB – Cameron Brate 5-yard pass from Jameis Winston (Kick failed, wide left), 15:00. Raiders 17–16. **Drive: 3 plays, 47 yards, 1:12.**
- TB – Jacquizz Rodgers 1-yard run (Jameis Winston–Mike Evans pass), 3:53. Buccaneers 24–17. **Drive: 9 plays, 82 yards, 4:45.**
- OAK – Mychal Rivera 7-yard pass from Derek Carr (Sebastian Janikowski kick), 1:43. Tied 24–24. **Drive: 9 plays, 75 yards, 2:10.**

**Overtime**

- OAK – Seth Roberts 41-yard pass from Derek Carr, 1:55. Raiders 30–24. 'Drive: 5 plays, 60 yards, 1:36.

**Top passers**

- OAK – Derek Carr – 40/59, 513 yards, 4 TDs
- TB – Jameis Winston – 16/32, 180 yards, 2 TDs

**Top rushers**

- OAK – Latavius Murray – 11 rushes, 48 yards
- TB – Jacquizz Rodgers – 19 rushes, 69 yards, TD

**Top receivers**

- OAK – Amari Cooper – 12 receptions, 173 yards, TD
- TB – Adam Humphries – 3 receptions, 58 yards

The Raiders traveled to Tampa Bay looking to improve to 6–2 overall and 5–0 on the road on the season. Tampa scored on a Roberto Aguayo 41-yard field goal and Jameis Winston threw a 19-yard touchdown pass to put the Buccaneers up 10–0 early in the second quarter. The Raiders started slow, managing only a Sebastian Janikowski field goal in the first half and the Bucs led 10–3 at the half. The Raiders offense came alive in the second half as Derek Carr hit offensive lineman Donald Penn on a tackle eligible play from the 1-yard line for his first touchdown pass of the game, to tie the game at 10. On the next Raider possession, Carr hit Amari Cooper on a 34-yard touchdown pass to give the Raiders their first lead of the game. However, Tampa Bay answered soon thereafter, taking the lead on Cameron Brate touchdown reception and a Jacquizz Rodgers touchdown run to move ahead 24–17 early in the fourth quarter. Carr threw his third touchdown of the game, this time to tight end Mychal Rivera with 1:38 remaining in the game. With the game tied and the clock running out, the Bucs punted the ball back to the Raiders with 58 seconds remaining. The Raiders drove to field goal position, but Janikowski missed a 50-yard field goal wide left as time expired to force overtime. On the first possession of overtime, the Raiders again moved into scoring position, but due to penalties were forced to settle for a 52-yard field goal attempt which Janikowski missed wide right. The Raider defense held the Buccaneers to consecutive three and out series and the Raiders took over with 3:21 left in overtime. Carr led the Raiders to the Tampa Bay 41, and coach Jack Del Rio chose to go for it on fourth down. Carr hit Seth Roberts for the first down and he broke tackles as he scampered 41 yards for the game-winning touchdown. Carr threw for a franchise record 513 yards on 40–59 passing with four touchdowns. The Raiders won despite setting an NFL record for penalties in a game, with 23 total penalties. The win kept the Raiders in a first place tie with Denver at 6–2. The Raiders moved to 5–0 on the road for the first time since 1977.

==== Week 9: vs. Denver Broncos ====
Week Nine: Denver Broncos at Oakland Raiders – Game summary

Quarter	1	2	3	4	Total
Broncos	0	10	0	10	**20**
**Raiders**	6	14	0	10	**30**

at Oakland Alameda Coliseum, Oakland, California

- Date: November 6
- Game time: 5:30 p.m. PST
- Game weather: 65 °F (18 °C), partly cloudy
- Game attendance: 54,957
- Referee: Clete Blakeman
- TV announcers (NBC): Al Michaels, Cris Collinsworth and Michele Tafoya
- Recap, Gamebook

Game information

**First quarter**

- OAK – Sebastian Janikowski 24-yard field goal, 10:21. Raiders 3–0. **Drive: 8 plays, 47 yards, 4:12.**
- OAK – Sebastian Janikowski 29-yard field goal, 4:52. Raiders 6–0. **Drive: 9 plays, 47 yards, 4:27.**

**Second quarter**

- OAK – Latavius Murray 1-yard run (Sebastian Janikowski kick), 14:07. Raiders 13–0. **Drive: 9 plays, 57 yards, 4:28.**
- DEN – Jordan Norwood 36-yard pass from Trevor Siemian (Brandon McManus kick), 8:22. Raiders 13–7. **Drive: 7 plays, 84 yards, 3:31.**
- OAK – Latavius Murray 1-yard run (Sebastian Janikowski kick), 1:25. Raiders 20–7. **Drive: 6 plays, 75 yards, 1:39.**
- DEN – Brandon McManus 55-yard field goal, 0:00. Raiders 20–10. **Drive: 7 plays, 43 yards, 1:25.**

**Third quarter**

- No scoring plays

**Fourth quarter**

- DEN – Brandon McManus 44-yard field goal, 14:56. Raiders 20–13. **Drive: 11 plays, 73 yards, 4:38.**
- OAK – Sebastian Janikowski 35-yard field goal, 8:19. Raiders 23–13. **Drive: 10 plays, 58 yards, 6:37.**
- OAK – Latavius Murray 1-yard run (Sebastian Janikowski kick), 6:09. Raiders 30–13. **Drive: 4 plays, 39 yards, 1:04.**
- DEN – Kapri Bibbs 69-yard pass from Trevor Siemian (Brandon McManus kick), 5:18. Raiders 30–20. **Drive: 2 plays, 75 yards, 0:51.**

**Top passers**

- DEN – Trevor Siemian – 18/37, 283 yards, 2 TD, INT
- OAK – Derek Carr – 20/31, 184 yards

**Top rushers**

- DEN – Devontae Booker – 10 rushes, 22 yards
- OAK – Latavius Murray – 20 rushes, 114 yards, 3 TD

**Top receivers**

- DEN – Kapri Bibbs – 1 reception, 69 yards, TD
- OAK – Amari Cooper – 6 receptions, 56 yards

The Raiders looked to take full possession of first place in the AFC West as they took on the defending champion Denver Broncos in Oakland on a Sunday night game for the first time in more than a decade. Things started well for the Raiders as they held Denver to three-and-outs on their first four possessions. Sebastian Janikowski hit two early field goals to give the Raiders a 6–0 lead. On the Raiders third possession, Latavius Murray capped off a 57-yard drive with a one-yard touchdown run to increase the lead to 13–0. Following the Raiders first punt of the game, the Broncos marched 84 yards for a touchdown on a pass from Trevor Siemian to Jordan Norwood to reduce the Raiders lead to 13–7. After Janikowski missed a 48-yard field goal and following another three-and-out for the Broncos, Murray scored his second touchdown of the game and increase the lead to 20–7. The Broncos added a field goal as the first half ended, putting them within 10 at 20–10. No team could muster any points in the third quarter, but a second field goal by Brandon McManus cut the lead to seven with 14:56 left in the game. The Raiders answered with a field goal and Khalil Mack sacked and stripped Siemian to give the Raiders the ball on the Denver 39-yard line. Murray's third one-yard touchdown of the game put the Raiders up comfortably at 30–13. Denver answered immediately on the second play of the ensuing drive when Kapri Bibbs took a screen pass 75 yards to cut the lead to ten. However, the Raider defense stepped up again and forced Siemian to throw an interception to Reggie Nelson with 23 seconds remaining to end the threat. The Raiders ran for 218 yards and held Denver to just 33 yards rushing. Carr threw for 184 yards and Murray rushed for 114 in addition to his three touchdown runs. The win put the Raiders at 7–2 on the season and in sole possession of first place in the AFC West as they headed to their bye week.

==== Week 11: vs. Houston Texans ====
NFL International Series

Week Eleven: Houston Texans at Oakland Raiders – Game summary

Quarter	1	2	3	4	Total
Texans	3	7	7	3	**20**
**Raiders**	0	10	3	14	**27**

at Estadio Azteca, Mexico City, Mexico

- Date: November 21
- Game time: 7:30 p.m. CST/5:30 p.m. PST
- Game weather: 63 °F (17 °C), clear
- Game attendance: 76,473
- Referee: Tony Corrente
- TV announcers (ESPN): Sean McDonough, Jon Gruden and Lisa Salters
- Recap, Gamebook

Game information

**First quarter**

- HOU – Nick Novak 32-yard field goal, 8:34. Texans 3–0. **Drive: 13 plays, 61 yards, 6:26.**

**Second quarter**

- OAK – Jalen Richard 17-yard pass from Derek Carr (Sebastian Janikowski kick), 14:54. Raiders 7–3. **Drive: 8 plays, 79 yards, 4:35.**
- OAK – Sebastian Janikowski 19-yard field goal, 12:48. Raiders 10–3. **Drive: 5 plays, 18 yards, 2:06.**
- HOU – Braxton Miller 12-yard pass from Brock Osweiler (Nick Novak kick), 7:59. Tied 10–10. **Drive: 9 plays, 75 yards, 4:49.**

**Third quarter**

- HOU – Lamar Miller 1-yard run (Nick Novak kick), 8:32. Texans 17–10. **Drive: 13 plays, 65 yards, 6:19.**
- OAK – Sebastian Janikowski 20-yard field goal, 2:39. Texans 17–13. **Drive: 12 plays, 73 yards, 5:53.**

**Fourth quarter**

- HOU – Nick Novak 28-yard field goal, 10:57. Texans 20–13. **Drive: 12 plays, 64 yards, 6:42.**
- OAK – Jamize Olawale 75-yard pass from Derek Carr (Sebastian Janikowski kick), 10:44. Tied 20–20. **Drive: 1 play, 75 yards, 0:13.**
- OAK – Amari Cooper 35-yard pass from Derek Carr (Sebastian Janikowski kick), 4:43. Raiders 27–20. **Drive: 5 plays, 85 yards, 1:32.**

**Top passers**

- HOU – Brock Osweiler – 26/39, 243 yards, TD, INT
- OAK – Derek Carr – 21/31, 295 yards, 3 TD, INT

**Top rushers**

- HOU – Lamar Miller – 24 rushes, 104 yards, TD
- OAK – Latavius Murray – 12 rushes, 33 yards

**Top receivers**

- HOU – C. J. Fiedorowicz – 6 receptions, 82 yards
- OAK – Jamize Olawale – 3 receptions, 90 yards, TD

Following the Raiders bye week, the team traveled to Mexico City to play the Houston Texans in a home game. A win for the Raiders would put them in sole possession of first place in the AFC West after a loss by the Kansas City Chiefs the day before. However, the Raiders defense struggled early and were unable to put much pressure on Texans' quarterback Brock Osweiler. However, they were helped all night by controversial calls by the officiating crew. The first was in the Texans' first drive as DeAndre Hopkins appeared to have stayed in bounds and scored on a 60-yard pass from Osweiler. However, officials ruled that Hopkins had stepped out of bounds and the play was blown dead. As a result, the play could not be reviewed and the Raiders only surrendered a field goal on the opening drive of the game. Following consecutive four-and-outs by both teams, the Raiders offense mustered a drive into Houston territory capped off by a 17-yard touchdown pass by Derek Carr to Jalen Richard to give the Raiders a 7–3 lead to begin the second quarter. On the ensuing kickoff, the Texans turned the ball right back over to the Raiders, but the offense could not punch the ball in from the one-yard line and settled for a Sebastian Janikowski 19-yard field goal to extend the lead to 10–3. The Texans quickly answered as Osweiler hit Braxton Miller for a 12-yard touchdown pass to even the score at 10–10. Neither offense was able to manage much for the remainder of the half and a sack by Khalil Mack ended the first half with a tie score. On the first play of the second half, Carr was pressured and threw a deep pass that was intercepted by the Texans. The ensuing 13-play drive capped off by a one-yard touchdown run Lamar Miller gave the Texans the lead, 17–10. The Raiders responded, getting to the Texans two-yard line, but could not punch the ball in again and settled for a second Janikowski field goal cutting the lead to 17–13. The Texans ended a long drive with a Nick Novak field goal to extend the lead to 20–13 with 11 minutes remaining in the game. Carr responded by finding Jamize Olawale wide open for a 75-yard pass and run to tie the game at 20. The Texans pushed the ball deep into Raiders territory again but were stopped on short yardage situations twice as controversial spots of the ball by officials turned the ball over to the Raiders on downs. The Raiders took advantage as Carr hit Amari Cooper on a pass and catch for a 35-yard touchdown play. The extra point gave the Raiders a 27–20 lead with 4:43 remaining in the game. The defense who had mustered little pressure on Osweiler all night, allowed a first down by the Texans, but then forced a punt with 3:13 remaining. On second and seven from their own 23-yard line, Carr heaved a 29-yard pass to Richard for a first down. After the two minute warning and the Texans final timeout, Latavius Murray was able to get another first down and the Raiders were able to run out the clock. The win put the Raiders at 8–2 on the season and gave them the No. 1 seed in the playoffs at the time. Carr finished with 295 yards and three touchdowns while the Raider running game only mustered 30 yards rushing against the Texans defense. The Raiders also clinched a non losing season for the first time since 2011. Another win will clinch the Raiders their first winning season for the first time since 2002.

==== Week 12: vs. Carolina Panthers ====
Week Twelve: Carolina Panthers at Oakland Raiders – Game summary

Quarter	1	2	3	4	Total
Panthers	7	0	18	7	**32**
**Raiders**	7	17	0	11	**35**

at Oakland Alameda Coliseum, Oakland, California

- Date: November 27
- Game time: 1:25 p.m. PST
- Game weather: 59 °F (15 °C), partly cloudy
- Game attendance: 54,909
- Referee: Jerome Boger
- TV announcers (CBS): Jim Nantz, Phil Simms and Tracy Wolfson
- Recap, Gamebook

Game information

**First quarter**

- OAK – Seth Roberts 2-yard pass from Derek Carr (Sebastian Janikowski kick), 4:48. Raiders 7–0. **Drive: 5 plays, 62 yards, 2:31.**
- CAR – Cam Newton 3-yard run (Graham Gano kick), 3:10. Tied 7–7. **Drive: 3 plays, 75 yards, 1:38.**

**Second quarter**

- OAK – Latavius Murray 4-yard run (Sebastian Janikowski kick), 12:48. Raiders 14–7. **Drive: 10 plays, 71 yards, 5:22.**
- OAK – Sebastian Janikowski 23-yard field goal, 6:49. Raiders 17–7. **Drive: 8 plays, 41 yards, 3:41.**
- OAK – Khalil Mack 6-yard interception return (Sebastian Janikowski kick), 0:59. Raiders 24–7.

**Third quarter**

- CAR – Jonathan Stewart 1-yard run (kick blocked), 10:33. Raiders 24–13. **Drive: 6 plays, 30 yards, 3:39.**
- CAR – Ted Ginn Jr. 88-yard pass from Cam Newton (pass failed), 7:43. Raiders 24–19. **Drive: 3 plays, 92 yards, 0:57.**
- CAR – Jonathan Stewart 3-yard run (pass failed), 1:46. Panthers 25–24. **Drive: 5 plays, 28 yards, 2:43.**

**Fourth quarter**

- CAR – Kelvin Benjamin 44-yard pass from Cam Newton (Graham Gano kick), 13:26. Panthers 32–24. **Drive: 7 plays, 76 yards, 2:57.**
- OAK – Clive Walford 12-yard pass from Derek Carr (Derek Carr–Seth Roberts pass), 8:37. Tied 32–32. **Drive: 10 plays, 75 yards, 4:49.**
- OAK – Sebastian Janikowski 23-yard field goal, 1:45. Raiders 35–32. **Drive: 12 plays, 82 yards, 3:20.**

**Top passers**

- CAR – Cam Newton – 14/29, 246 yards, 2 TD, INT
- OAK – Derek Carr – 26/38, 315 yards, 2 TD, INT

**Top rushers**

- CAR – Jonathan Stewart – 17 rushes, 96 yards, 2 TD
- OAK – Latavius Murray – 19 rushes, 45 yards, TD

**Top receivers**

- CAR – Ted Ginn Jr. – 4 receptions, 115 yards, TD
- OAK – Michael Crabtree – 8 receptions, 110 yards

Following their home game in Mexico, the Raiders returned to Oakland to face the Carolina Panthers. The Raiders were looking to extend their winning streak to five games, the longest streak since their Super Bowl season of 2002. Things started well as the Raiders defense held the Panthers to a three-and-out series and the Raiders offense moved right down the field. Seth Roberts caught a two-yard pass from Derek Carr to put the Raiders up 7–0. The Panthers answered on a three-yard touchdown run by Cam Newton to tie the score. The rest of the first half belonged to the Raiders as Latavius Murray scored from four yards out and Sebastian Janikowski kicked a 23-yard field goal to put the Raiders up 17–7. The Panther took over with 1:56 remaining in the second quarter looking to cut the Raider lead, but Khalil Mack made an acrobatic catch of Newton pass and returned it six yards for another Raider touchdown. The Panthers took a knee on the final possession of the half as the Raiders held a 24–7 lead. On the second play of the third quarter, Carr injured the pinky finger of his throwing hand on an awkward snap. The play resulted in a fumble recovered by the Panthers. Six plays later, Jonathan Stewart scored from one-yard out to cut the lead to 24–13 after the extra point was blocked. With Carr in the locker room tending to his injured finger, Matt McGloin took over for the Raiders, but they could not muster any offense and were forced to punt. Newton then hit Ted Ginn Jr. on an 88-yard pass and catch to put the Panthers with five. The Panthers opted to go for two points, but failed and, therefore, trailed 24–19. Carr returned to the game with a glove on this throwing hand on the next possession, but after completing two passes, Carr was intercepted by Thomas Davis. The Panthers continued their hot start to the half as Stewart scored his second rushing touchdown of the game. The Panthers again failed on their two-point conversion, but now held the lead, 25–24. Following three straight incompletions by Carr, the Panthers took over and extended the lead on a 44-yard pass from Newton to Kelvin Benjamin. Now trailing 32–24, the Raiders answered on a 10-play drive capped off by a Clive Walford 12-yard touchdown reception. The two point conversion was good on a Carr pass to Roberts and the game was tied at 32. The Raiders defense forced a punt by the Panthers and the Raiders took over with 5:05 remaining in the game. The Raiders 12-play drive stalled at the Carolina six-yard line, but Janikowski hit his second field goal of the game to give the Raiders a 35–32 lead. With 1:45 remaining in the game, the Panthers looked to tie or take the lead. However, Mack continued his great day and stripped Newton of the ball and recovered the ball on a fourth and 10 play to ice the game for the Raiders. Mack finished with a sack, an interception, a forced fumble, and a touchdown, the first of his career. Carr finished with 315 yards and two touchdown despite missing a series with his injured finger. The Raiders improved to 9–2 on the season and remained in first place in the division. The win also clinched a winning season for the Raiders for the first time since 2002.

==== Week 13: vs. Buffalo Bills ====
Week Thirteen: Buffalo Bills at Oakland Raiders – Game summary

Quarter	1	2	3	4	Total
Bills	3	7	14	0	**24**
**Raiders**	3	6	14	15	**38**

at Oakland Alameda Coliseum, Oakland, California

- Date: December 4
- Game time: 1:05 p.m. PST
- Game weather: 59 °F (15 °C), partly cloudy
- Game attendance: 54,759
- Referee: Bill Vinovich
- TV announcers (CBS): Ian Eagle, Dan Fouts and Evan Washburn
- Recap, Gamebook

Game information

**First quarter**

- BUF – Dan Carpenter 27-yard field goal, 8:02. Bills 3–0. **Drive: 10 plays, 72 yards, 4:10.**
- OAK – Sebastian Janikowski 47-yard field goal, 4:35. Tied 3–3. **Drive: 8 plays, 46 yards, 3:27.**

**Second quarter**

- BUF – Mike Gillislee 1-yard run (Dan Carpenter kick), 13:28. Bills 10–3. **Drive: 11 plays, 80 yards, 6:07.**
- OAK – Sebastian Janikowski 41-yard field goal, 2:56. Bills 10–6. **Drive: 11 plays, 38 yards, 4:24.**
- OAK – Sebastian Janikowski 47-yard field goal, 0:00. Bills 10–9. **Drive: 5 plays, 57 yards, 0:30.**

**Third quarter**

- BUF – Tyrod Taylor 12-yard run (Dan Carpenter kick), 14:03. Bills 17–9. **Drive: 2 plays, 66 yards, 0:57.**
- BUF – Mike Gillislee 2-yard run (Dan Carpenter kick), 9:01. Bills 24–9. **Drive: 10 plays, 54 yards, 4:10.**
- OAK – Michael Crabtree 3-yard pass from Derek Carr (Sebastian Janikowski kick), 5:17. Bills 24–16. **Drive: 9 plays, 75 yards, 3:44.**
- OAK – Latavius Murray 1-yard run (Sebastian Janikowski kick), 0:57. Bills 24–23. **Drive: 5 plays, 38 yards, 3:03.**

**Fourth quarter**

- OAK – Amari Cooper 37-yard pass from Derek Carr (Sebastian Janikowski kick), 14:08. Raiders 30–24. **Drive: 5 plays, 59 yards, 0:40.**
- OAK – Latavius Murray 1-yard run (Derek Carr–Seth Roberts pass), 8:34. Raiders 38–24. **Drive: 4 plays, 16 yards, 2:11.**

**Top passers**

- BUF – Tyrod Taylor – 18/35, 191 yards, INT
- OAK – Derek Carr – 19/35, 260 yards, 2 TD

**Top rushers**

- BUF – LeSean McCoy – 17 rushes, 130 yards
- OAK – Latavius Murray – 20 rushes, 82 yards, 2 TD

**Top receivers**

- BUF – LeSean McCoy – 7 receptions, 61 yards
- OAK – Michael Crabtree – 7 receptions, 74 yards, TD

The Raiders entered Week 13 looking to keep their first place lead in the AFC West following wins by both the Broncos and Chiefs earlier in the day. However, the Buffalo Bills scored first on the second possession of the game as Dan Carpenter hit a 27-yard field goal to give the Bills a 3–0 lead. A Sebastian Janikowski field goal from 47 yards out, tied the game on the next possession. The Bills offense struck next as Mike Gillislee scored from one yard out to give the Bills a 10–3 lead early in the second quarter. The Raider offense managed two more Janikowski field goals, including one as the half ended to pull within one point, 10–9. To open the second half, the Bills extended their lead on a two-play drive, a 54-yard run by LeSean McCoy and a 12-yard touchdown run by Tyrod Taylor. The Raiders offense managed little on its next possession and the Bills took a 15-point lead with a Gillislee two-yard touchdown run, increasing the lead to 24–9. The Raiders five-game win streak appeared to be over, but the Raiders fought back as they had all year. On their next possession, Derek Carr, taking all snaps from the shotgun due to the injured finger he suffered in the prior game, hit Michael Crabtree on a three-yard touchdown pass to reduce the lead to 24–16. The Raiders defense forced a punt which gave the Raiders good field position at the Buffalo 38-yard line. Five plays later, Latavius Murray plunged over the goal line from a yard out to reduce the lead to one, 24–23. The Bills were again forced to punt and the Raiders offense went right down the field. Carr hit Amari Cooper on a 37-yard pitch and catch to give the Raiders the lead, 30–24. Following punts by both teams that left Buffalo at its own four-yard line early in the fourth quarter, Khalil Mack hit Taylor's arm on a pass and the ball was intercepted by Nate Allen at the Buffalo 16-yard line. Four plays later, Murray again plunged over the goal line for a three-yard touchdown run which pushed the Raider lead to 36–24. A two-point conversion pass from Carr to Seth Roberts put the lead at 14, 38–24. The Bills, however, drove the ball to the Raider 17-yard line before Mack sacked and stripped Taylor of the ball. Mack also recovered the fumble to put the game away. The 29 unanswered points to overcome the 15-point deficit was the Raiders best comeback since 1963. Carr finished with 260 yards and two touchdown passes. The win was the Raiders sixth in a row and kept the Raiders one game up on the Chiefs heading into their showdown on Thursday night. The win also put the Raiders back as the number one seed in the playoffs.

==== Week 14: at Kansas City Chiefs ====
Week Fourteen: Oakland Raiders at Kansas City Chiefs – Game summary

Quarter	1	2	3	4	Total
Raiders	3	7	3	0	**13**
**Chiefs**	0	21	0	0	**21**

at Arrowhead Stadium, Kansas City, Missouri

- Date: December 8
- Game time: 7:25 p.m. CST/5:25 p.m. PST
- Game weather: 21 °F (−6 °C), clear
- Game attendance: 75,191
- Referee: Terry McAulay
- TV announcers (NBC/NFLN/Twitter): Al Michaels, Cris Collinsworth and Heather Cox
- Recap, Gamebook

Game information

**First quarter**

- OAK – Sebastian Janikowski 44-yard field goal, 11:34. Raiders 3–0. **Drive: 7 plays, 12 yards, 1:53.**

**Second quarter**

- KC – Tyreek Hill 36-yard pass from Alex Smith (Cairo Santos kick), 14:51. Chiefs 7–3. **Drive: 5 plays, 70 yards, 1:38.**
- KC – Charcandrick West 3-yard run (Cairo Santos kick), 8:34. Chiefs 14–3. **Drive: 7 plays, 78 yards, 4:56.**
- KC – Tyreek Hill 78-yard punt return (Cairo Santos kick), 6:25. Chiefs 21–3.
- OAK – Latavius Murray 1-yard run (Sebastian Janikowski kick), 0:14. Chiefs 21–10. **Drive: 14 plays, 92 yards, 6:11.**

**Third quarter**

- OAK – Sebastian Janikowski 33-yard field goal, 13:09. Chiefs 21–13. **Drive: 4 plays, 4 yards, 0:57.**

**Fourth quarter**

- No scoring plays

**Top passers**

- OAK – Derek Carr – 17/41, 117 yards
- KC – Alex Smith – 17/26, 264 yards, TD, INT

**Top rushers**

- OAK – Latavius Murray – 22 rushes, 103 yards, TD
- KC – Spencer Ware – 10 rushes, 56 yards

**Top receivers**

- OAK – Amari Cooper – 5 receptions, 29 yards
- KC – Travis Kelce – 5 receptions, 101 yards

With a chance to clinch a playoff spot for the first time since 2002, the Raiders traveled to Kansas City for a crucial Thursday night matchup to determine the AFC West division lead. The Raiders needed a win and a Miami Dolphins loss or a win and a Denver Broncos loss to clinch a playoff berth. Oakland started well, recovering a muffed fumble by Tyreek Hill on a punt following their first drive and setting them up at the Kansas City 38-yard line. However, the Raiders had to settle for a field goal by Sebastian Janikowsi to take the early 3–0 lead. It would be the last lead the Raiders enjoyed on the night. Oakland's offense could muster little for most of the first half including after the Raider defense stopped KC on a fourth and one at the Oakland 27. The Chiefs took the lead early in the second quarter on a 36-yard pass from Alex Smith to Hill to make the score 7–3. After a four-and-out possession for the Raiders, the Chiefs again went down the field scoring on a Charcandrick West three-yard touchdown run. Following another Raiders short offensive possession, Hill returned a punt 78 yards for a touchdown to extend the Chief lead to 21–3. With six minutes remaining in the half, the Raiders went up-tempo and moved the ball down the field capping the drive with a one-yard touchdown run by Latavius Murray with 14 seconds remaining. At the half, the Raiders trailed 21–10. To begin the second half, the Raider defense stepped up intercepting Smith on the second play of the half and giving the offense the ball at the KC 23. However, the offense was shut down by the KC defense and settled for another Janikowski field goal, bringing them within a touchdown of the Chiefs at 21–13. On the next offensive play for the Chiefs, Khalil Mack sacked and stripped Smith of the ball and the Raiders recovered at the KC 18-yard line. The offense again managed little and was forced to settle for a field goal attempt. However, a bad snap resulted in Marquette King being tackled for three-yard loss. Both offenses mustered very little for the remainder of the game. With seven minutes left in the game, the Raiders needed a touchdown to tie and moved down to the KC 19-yard line, but were stopped on fourth down and the Chiefs ran the clock out. Derek Carr struggled mightily with his accuracy on the night, only completing 17 of his 41 pass attempts for 117 yards. He often missed open receivers or badly threw behind receivers. Carr admitted he had a bad night saying, "Obviously, we didn't do enough." The loss ended the Raiders six-game win streak and gave the Chiefs the lead in the division with a 2–0 record over the Raiders. The Raiders, still, in prime playoff position, would have to finish ahead of the Chiefs to win the division.

==== Week 15: at San Diego Chargers ====
Week Fifteen: Oakland Raiders at San Diego Chargers – Game summary

Quarter	1	2	3	4	Total
**Raiders**	3	7	3	6	**19**
Chargers	7	3	6	0	**16**

at Qualcomm Stadium, San Diego, California

- Date: December 18
- Game time: 1:25 p.m. PST
- Game weather: 62 °F (17 °C), sunny
- Game attendance: 68,352
- Referee: John Parry
- TV announcers (CBS): Spero Dedes and Solomon Wilcots
- Recap, Gamebook

Game information

**First quarter**

- SD – Travis Benjamin 47-yard pass from Philip Rivers (Josh Lambo kick), 10:32. Chargers 7–0. **Drive: 8 plays, 91 yards, 4:28.**
- OAK – Sebastian Janikowski 35-yard field goal, 4:53. Chargers 7–3. **Drive: 11 plays, 44 yards, 5:39.**

**Second quarter**

- SD – Josh Lambo 35-yard field goal, 1:29. Chargers 10–3. **Drive: 14 plays, 63 yards, 3:58.**
- OAK – Michael Crabtree 13-yard pass from Derek Carr (Sebastian Janikowski kick), 0:22. Tied 10–10. **Drive: 6 plays, 75 yards, 1:07.**

**Third quarter**

- OAK – Sebastian Janikowski 33-yard field goal, 10:48. Raiders 13–10. **Drive: 8 plays, 45 yards, 8:45.**
- SD – Hunter Henry 7-yard pass from Philip Rivers (kick blocked), 6:14. Chargers 16–13. **Drive: 7 plays, 77 yards, 4:34.**

**Fourth quarter**

- OAK – Sebastian Janikowski 21-yard field goal, 8:38. Tied 16–16. **Drive: 6 plays, 11 yards, 2:57.**
- OAK – Sebastian Janikowski 44-yard field goal, 2:40. Raiders 19–16. **Drive: 9 plays, 54 yards, 3:47.**

**Top passers**

- OAK – Derek Carr – 19/30, 213 yards, TD, INT
- SD – Philip Rivers – 17/30, 206 yards, 2 TD, INT

**Top rushers**

- OAK – Latavius Murray – 13 rushes, 81 yards
- SD – Kenneth Farrow – 15 rushes, 39 yards

**Top receivers**

- OAK – Michael Crabtree – 6 receptions, 60 yards, TD
- SD – Dontrelle Inman – 5 receptions, 68 yards

**Top tacklers**

- OAK – David Amerson 6
- SD – Jahleel Addae 8

The Raiders travelled to face the San Diego Chargers with a chance to secure their first playoff bid since 2002. In a stadium at least half full of Raider fans, the Chargers took an early lead on a pass from Philip Rivers to Travis Benjamin to put the Chargers up 7–0. The Raiders responded with an 11-play drive that stalled on the Charger 27-yard line and had to settle for a Sebastian Janikowski field goal to narrow the lead to 7–3. Neither team could muster anything offensively for the remainder of the quarter. A promising Raider drive to the Charger 16-yard line stalled again as Derek Carr was intercepted inside the 10-yard line. A Charger field goal following a 14-play drive put the Chargers up 10–3 with 1:33 left in the half. The Raider offense switched to their two-minute offense and cruised down the field before Carr hit Michael Crabtree in the corner of the end zone to tie the game at 10. The Raider offense drove deep into San Diego territory to open the second half, but had to settle for another Janikowski field goal to take the lead 13–10. The Chargers answered with a Rivers seven-yard touchdown pass to Hunter Henry to retake the lead. A missed extra point left the lead at 16–13. The remainder of the third quarter saw the offenses accomplish little before Charger running back Kenneth Farrow fumbled at the San Diego 14 early in the fourth quarter. The Raiders offense could not take advantage of the turnover and settled for Jankowski's third field of the game to tie it at 16. The Raider defense again stopped the Chargers and the offense, led by Latavius Murray and Jalen Richard, moved the ball into San Diego territory again. For the fourth time, the offense settled for a Janikowski field goal to take the lead 19–16 with 3:47 remaining. On the ensuing San Diego possession, Rivers was intercepted by Reggie Nelson to allow the Raiders to take over and run out the clock. The win gave the Raiders their first playoff appearance since 2002. With a loss earlier in the day by Kansas City, the Raiders also took back first place in the AFC West.

==== Week 16: vs. Indianapolis Colts ====
Week Sixteen: Indianapolis Colts at Oakland Raiders – Game summary

Quarter	1	2	3	4	Total
Colts	0	7	7	11	**25**
**Raiders**	0	19	14	0	**33**

at Oakland Alameda Coliseum, Oakland, California

- Date: December 24
- Game time: 1:05 p.m. PST
- Game weather: 50 °F (10 °C), sunny
- Game attendance: 54,896
- Referee: Ed Hochuli
- TV announcers (CBS): Jim Nantz, Phil Simms and Tracy Wolfson
- Recap, Gamebook

Game information

**First quarter**

- No scoring plays

**Second quarter**

- OAK – Andre Holmes 1-yard pass from Derek Carr (Sebastian Janikowski kick), 14:57. Raiders 7–0. **Drive: 12 plays, 54 yards, 7:12.**
- IND – Donte Moncrief 24-yard pass from Andrew Luck (Adam Vinatieri kick), 9:49. Tied 7–7. **Drive: 9 plays, 75 yards, 5:08.**
- OAK – Clive Walford 5-yard pass from Derek Carr (kick failed, wide left), 5:50. Raiders 13–7. **Drive: 8 plays, 79 yards, 3:59.**
- OAK – Jalen Richard 4-yard pass from Derek Carr (kick blocked), 0:18. Raiders 19–7. **Drive: 6 plays, 80 yards, 0:55.**

**Third quarter**

- OAK – DeAndré Washington 22-yard run (Sebastian Janikowski kick), 10:48. Raiders 26–7. **Drive: 7 plays, 77 yards, 4:12.**
- OAK – DeAndre Washington 22-yard run (Sebastian Janikowski kick), 8:40. Raiders 33–7. **Drive: 3 plays, 38 yards, 1:33.**
- IND – Robert Turbin 3-yard pass from Andrew Luck (Adam Vinatieri kick), 5:18. Raiders 33–14. **Drive: 8 plays, 75 yards, 3:22.**

**Fourth quarter**

- IND – Andrew Luck 11-yard run (Andrew Luck–T. Y. Hilton pass), 7:40. Raiders 33–22. **Drive: 6 plays, 68 yards, 2:36.**
- IND – Adam Vinatieri 42-yard field goal, 2:33. Raiders 33–25. **Drive: 5 plays, 40 yards, 1:15.**

**Top passers**

- IND – Andrew Luck – 19/29, 288 yards, 2 TD, 2 INT
- OAK – Derek Carr – 20/30, 228 yards, 3 TD

**Top rushers**

- IND – Frank Gore – 13 rushes, 73 yards
- OAK – DeAndré Washington – 12 rushes, 99 yards, 2 TD

**Top receivers**

- IND – T. Y. Hilton – 4 receptions, 105 yards
- OAK – Michael Crabtree – 7 receptions, 90 yards

The Raiders entered Week 16 looking to maintain their lead in the division over the Chiefs. A win over the visiting Indianapolis Colts would further assist the Raiders attempt to win the AFC West, pending the Chiefs matchup against the Broncos on Christmas Day. Neither team managed much offense on their first possession of the game, but the Colts moved into Raider territory on their second possession. A bad snap on a field goal attempt, left the game scoreless. Following a Nate Allen interception of a pass from Andrew Luck, the Raiders looked to open the scoring. With good field position, the offense moved to the Colts one-yard line before Derek Carr threw a one-yard touchdown pass to Andre Holmes to give the Raiders a 7–0 lead on the first play of the second quarter. The Colts scored a touchdown to answer right back with Luck throwing touchdown pass to Donte Moncrief to tie the score. The Raiders, in turn, answered with a five-yard touchdown pass from Carr to Clive Walford. Sebastian Janikowski missed his first extra point of the season and lead was 13–7. On the next Colts drive, the Colts would drove to Oakland 29-yard line before Luck threw another interception, this time to Reggie Nelson in the endzone. The Raiders marched the length of the field and Carr hit Jalen Richard on a four-yard touchdown pass. Janikowski missed his second straight extra point as it was blocked, giving the Raiders a 19–7 lead at halftime. On the first possession of the second half, the Raiders again marched down the field and DeAndré Washington scored his first career rushing touchdown on a 22-yard run to push the lead to 26–7. The Colts turned the ball over again on their next possession as Malcolm Smith forced a fumble from Frank Gore which was recovered by T. J. Carrie. The Raider offense again capitalized on the turnover, leading to another 22-yard rushing touchdown for Washington, pushing the lead 33–7. The Colts offense looked to stem the blowout and torched the Raider defense on a drive which finished with a three-yard touchdown pass from Luck to Robert Turbin to cut the lead 33–14. After punts by both teams, the Raiders began a drive at Colts 44-yard line. With a little over 11 minutes remaining in the game, Derek Carr was sacked by Trent Cole, and suffered a significant injury to his right leg. The Raider offense, now led by backup quarterback Matt McGloin, stalled and were forced to punt the ball. Luck brought the game closer with an 11-yard touchdown run and hit T. Y. Hilton for the two-point conversion, cutting the lead 33–22. The Raiders punted again and the Colts settled for a field goal to draw to within a touchdown at 33–25. The Raider offense which had struggled mightily after Carr left the game, was able to get a first down as McGloin hit Amari Cooper on a 19-yard pass to allow the Raiders to run out the clock, securing the victory 33–25. The win kept the Raiders in first place in the division, but a victory for the Chiefs over the Broncos the next day meant the Raiders would still have to beat Denver in the final week to win the division. After the game, it was announced that Carr had a broken right fibula and would be out indefinitely.

==== Week 17: at Denver Broncos ====
Week Seventeen: Oakland Raiders at Denver Broncos – Game summary

Quarter	1	2	3	4	Total
Raiders	0	0	6	0	**6**
**Broncos**	7	10	7	0	**24**

at Sports Authority Field at Mile High, Denver, Colorado

- Date: January 1, 2017
- Game time: 2:25 p.m. MST/1:25 p.m. PST
- Game weather: 45 °F (7 °C), mostly cloudy
- Game attendance: 76,836
- Referee: Brad Allen
- TV announcers (CBS): Jim Nantz, Phil Simms and Tracy Wolfson
- Recap, Gamebook

Game information

**First quarter**

- DEN – Devontae Booker 11-yard run (Brandon McManus kick), 10:15. Broncos 7–0. **Drive: 8 plays, 84 yards, 4:45.**

**Second quarter**

- DEN – Brandon McManus 22-yard field goal, 11:30. Broncos 10–0. **Drive: 8 plays, 85 yards, 4:44.**
- DEN – Devontae Booker 43-yard pass from Trevor Siemian (Brandon McManus kick), 1:44. Broncos 17–0. **Drive: 5 plays, 58 yards, 2:24.**

**Third quarter**

- DEN – Virgil Green 2-yard pass from Trevor Siemian (Brandon McManus kick), 8:14. Broncos 24–0. **Drive: 10 plays, 64 yards, 4:46.**
- OAK – Amari Cooper 32-yard pass from Connor Cook (pass failed), 3:09. Broncos 24–6. **Drive: 3 plays, 63 yards, 1:29.**

**Fourth quarter**

- No scoring plays

**Top passers**

- OAK – Connor Cook – 14/21, 150 yards, TD, INT
- DEN – Trevor Siemian – 17/27, 206 yards, 2 TD, INT

**Top rushers**

- OAK – DeAndré Washington – 7 rushes, 43 yards
- DEN – Justin Forsett – 22 rushes, 90 yards

**Top receivers**

- OAK – Michael Crabtree – 5 receptions, 47 yards
- DEN – Devontae Booker – 2 receptions, 52 yards, TD

The Raiders entered the final game of the season with an opportunity to secure a first round bye as the number two seed in the AFC, but would have to do so without Derek Carr, following his injury on Christmas Eve. With a loss, the Raiders could still claim the number two seed, but they needed the Chiefs to lose to the Chargers. The Raiders started Matt McGloin, hoping he could provide enough offense to get the Raiders a win and the number two seed. The defense would also have to step up to secure the bye, but on the first drive of the game, they could not stop the Broncos: a 13-yard touchdown run by Devontae Booker gave the Broncos an early 7–0 lead. The Raider offense could not move the ball well on their first two possessions and, on the Broncos third possession, they extended the lead on a Brandon McManus field goal. With a little less than seven minutes remaining in the first half, McGloin was hit by Bronco defensive end, Jared Crick, resulting in a roughing the passer penalty. McGloin, though shaky after the hit, finished the drive. However, he was soon escorted to the locker room. The Broncos scored again with less than two minutes remaining on a pass from Trevor Siemian to Booker to extend the lead to 17–0. On the ensuing Raider possession, rookie Connor Cook entered the game to replace McGloin, but the Raiders went three-and-out. As the half ended, the Raiders postseason chances looked even worse with their third-string quarterback in the game, trailing 17–0, and the Chiefs beating the Chargers. Cook started and played the whole second half. The first drive started well for the Raiders, but Cook was sacked and fumbled the ball on the Denver 37-yard line. The Broncos marched down the field and Siemian hit Virgil Green for a two-yard touchdown pass to extend the lead to 24–0. The Raider offense managed a touchdown on catch and run from Amari Cooper from 32 yards out, but could muster nothing. The Raiders fell 24–6. Meanwhile, Kansas City defeated the Chargers and the Raiders fell to a wild card sport with the likelihood of having to send their third-string quarterback out as their starter against Houston in the playoffs. After the game, Broncos head coach Gary Kubiak announced he was retiring due to health issues.

== Postseason ==
=== Schedule ===
Round	Date	Opponent (seed)	Result	Record	Venue	Recap
Wild Card	January 7	at Houston Texans (4)	L 14–27	0–1	NRG Stadium	Recap

=== Game summaries ===
==== AFC Wild Card Playoffs: at (4) Houston Texans ====
AFC Wild Card Playoffs: (5) Oakland Raiders at (4) Houston Texans – Game summary

Quarter	1	2	3	4	Total
Raiders	7	0	0	7	14
Texans	10	10	0	7	27

at NRG Stadium, Houston, Texas

- Date: January 7, 2017
- Game time: 3:35 p.m. CST/1:35 p.m. PST
- Game weather: Played indoors (retractable roof closed)
- Game attendance: 71,790
- Referee: Ronald Torbert
- TV announcers (ESPN/ABC): Sean McDonough, Jon Gruden, Lisa Salters and Adam Schefter
- Recap, Gamebook

Game information

First quarter

- HOU – Nick Novak 50-yard field goal, 8:04. Texans 3–0. Drive: 4 plays, 8 yards, 1:45.
- HOU – Lamar Miller 5-yard run (Nick Novak kick), 6:16. Texans 10–0. Drive: 1 play, 5 yards, 0:02.
- OAK – Latavius Murray 2-yard run (Sebastian Janikowski kick), 1:01. Texans 10–7. Drive: 5 plays, 38 yards, 1:55.

Second quarter

- HOU – Nick Novak 38-yard field goal, 8:48. Texans 13–7. Drive: 9 plays, 75 yards, 4:17.
- HOU – DeAndre Hopkins 2-yard pass from Brock Osweiler (Nick Novak kick), 1:20. Texans 20–7. Drive: 4 plays, 60 yards, 1:05.

Third quarter

- No scoring plays

Fourth quarter

- HOU – Brock Osweiler 1-yard run (Nick Novak kick), 12:28. Texans 27–7. Drive: 7 plays, 53 yards, 2:49.
- OAK – Andre Holmes 8-yard pass from Connor Cook (Sebastian Janikowski kick), 8:10. Texans 27–14. Drive: 11 plays, 75 yards, 4:18.

Top passers

- OAK – Connor Cook 18/45, 161 yards, TD, 3 INT
- HOU – Brock Osweiler 14/25, 168 yards, TD

Top rushers

- OAK – Latavius Murray 12 carries, 39 yards, TD
- HOU – Lamar Miller 31 carries, 73 yards, TD

Top receivers

- OAK – Andre Holmes 4 receptions, 50 yards, TD
- HOU – DeAndre Hopkins 5 receptions, 67 yards, TD

With Derek Carr out indefinitely and the injury suffered in the final week of the season by Matt McGloin, the Raiders were forced to turn to rookie quarterback Connor Cook to start his first-ever NFL game, becoming the first rookie in NFL history since the inception of the Super Bowl to make his first career start in the playoffs. The Texans nominal starting quarterback, Tom Savage, would also miss the game due to concussion protocol which left the Houston offense in the hands of Brock Osweiler, who started 14 games in the regular season only being replaced by Savage late in the season. The Texans got the ball first, but their drive ended at the Raider 37-yard line. The Raiders followed with a three-and-out series to give the ball back to Houston at the Raider 40. The Texans could not muster a first down, but were able to get a 50-yard Nick Novak field goal to take the lead 3–0. On the ensuing Raider possession, Cook was intercepted on a screen pass by Jadeveon Clowney and Houston took over at the Raider four-yard line. A Lamar Miller four-yard touchdown run extended the Texan lead to 10–0. Following short possessions by both teams, the Raiders got good field position due to a 37-yard punt return by Jalen Richard at the Houston 38. Five plays later, Latavius Murray scored on a two-yard touchdown run to bring the Raiders within 10–7. The Texans Raiders exchanged three-and-outs, before the Texans added a Novak 38-yard field goal to extend the lead to 13–7 in the second quarter. Following stalled drives by both teams, the Texans took over with 2:25 remaining in the half. An Osweiler pass to DeAndre Hopkins for a two-yard touchdown reception gave the Texans a 20–7 lead at the half. Neither team was able to put anything on the scoreboard in the third quarter with only three total first downs in the quarter by the offenses. However, with 12:28 left to go in the fourth quarter, Osweiler scored from one yard out to put the game out of reach at 27–7. An 8-yard touchdown pass from Cook to Andre Holmes narrowed the lead, but back-to-back interceptions by Cook ended any attempt at a Raider comeback. The Raiders were eliminated from the postseason 27–14. Cook finished 18–45 with one touchdown and three interceptions. The Raider offense only managed a total of 203 yards on the day. This was the Raiders' final playoff game played while the team was based in Oakland, as they moved to Las Vegas in 2020.

== Standings ==
=== Division ===
AFC West
	W	L	T	PCT	DIV	CONF	PF	PA	STK
^{(2)} Kansas City Chiefs	12	4	0	.750	6–0	9–3	389	311	W2
^{(5)} Oakland Raiders	12	4	0	.750	3–3	9–3	416	385	L1
Denver Broncos	9	7	0	.563	2–4	6–6	333	297	W1
San Diego Chargers	5	11	0	.313	1–5	4–8	410	423	L5

=== Conference ===
AFC
#	Team	Division	W	L	T	PCT	DIV	CONF	SOS	SOV	STK
Division leaders
1	New England Patriots	East	14	2	0	.875	5–1	11–1	.439	.424	W7
2 (Note: Kansas City clinched the AFC West division over Oakland based on head-to-head sweep.)	Kansas City Chiefs	West	12	4	0	.750	6–0	9–3	.508	.479	W2
3	Pittsburgh Steelers	North	11	5	0	.688	5–1	9–3	.494	.423	W7
4 (Note: Houston clinched the AFC South division title over Tennessee based on record vs. division opponents.)	Houston Texans	South	9	7	0	.563	5–1	7–5	.502	.427	L1
Wild Cards
5	Oakland Raiders	West	12	4	0	.750	3–3	9–3	.504	.443	L1
6	Miami Dolphins	East	10	6	0	.625	4–2	7–5	.455	.341	L1
Did not qualify for the postseason
7 (Note: Tennessee finished ahead of Denver based on head-to-head victory.)	Tennessee Titans	South	9	7	0	.563	2–4	6–6	.465	.458	W1
8	Denver Broncos	West	9	7	0	.563	2–4	6–6	.549	.455	W1
9 (Note: Baltimore finished ahead of Indianapolis based on record vs. conference opponents.)	Baltimore Ravens	North	8	8	0	.500	4–2	7–5	.498	.363	L2
10	Indianapolis Colts	South	8	8	0	.500	3–3	5–7	.492	.406	W1
11	Buffalo Bills	East	7	9	0	.438	1–5	4–8	.482	.339	L2
12	Cincinnati Bengals	North	6	9	1	.406	3–3	5–7	.521	.333	W1
13 (Note: The New York Jets finished ahead of San Diego based record vs. common opponents — the Jets' cumulative record against Cleveland, Indianapolis, Kansas City and Miami was 1–4, while San Diego's cumulative record against the same four teams was 0–5.)	New York Jets	East	5	11	0	.313	2–4	4–8	.518	.313	W1
14	San Diego Chargers	West	5	11	0	.313	1–5	4–8	.543	.513	L5
15	Jacksonville Jaguars	South	3	13	0	.188	2–4	2–10	.527	.417	L1
16	Cleveland Browns	North	1	15	0	.063	0–6	1–11	.549	.313	L1
Tiebreakers (Note: When breaking ties for three or more teams under the NFL's rules, they are first broken within divisions, then comparing only the highest ranked remaining team from each division.)

== Awards and honors ==
=== Pro Bowlers ===
Pos.	Player
QB	Derek Carr
WR	Amari Cooper
C	Rodney Hudson
DE	Khalil Mack
S	Reggie Nelson
G/T	Kelechi Osemele
T	Donald Penn

=== All-Pro ===
Pos.	Player
DE	Khalil Mack
G/T	Kelechi Osemele
P	Marquette King
