= DeAndré Washington =

American football player (born 1993)

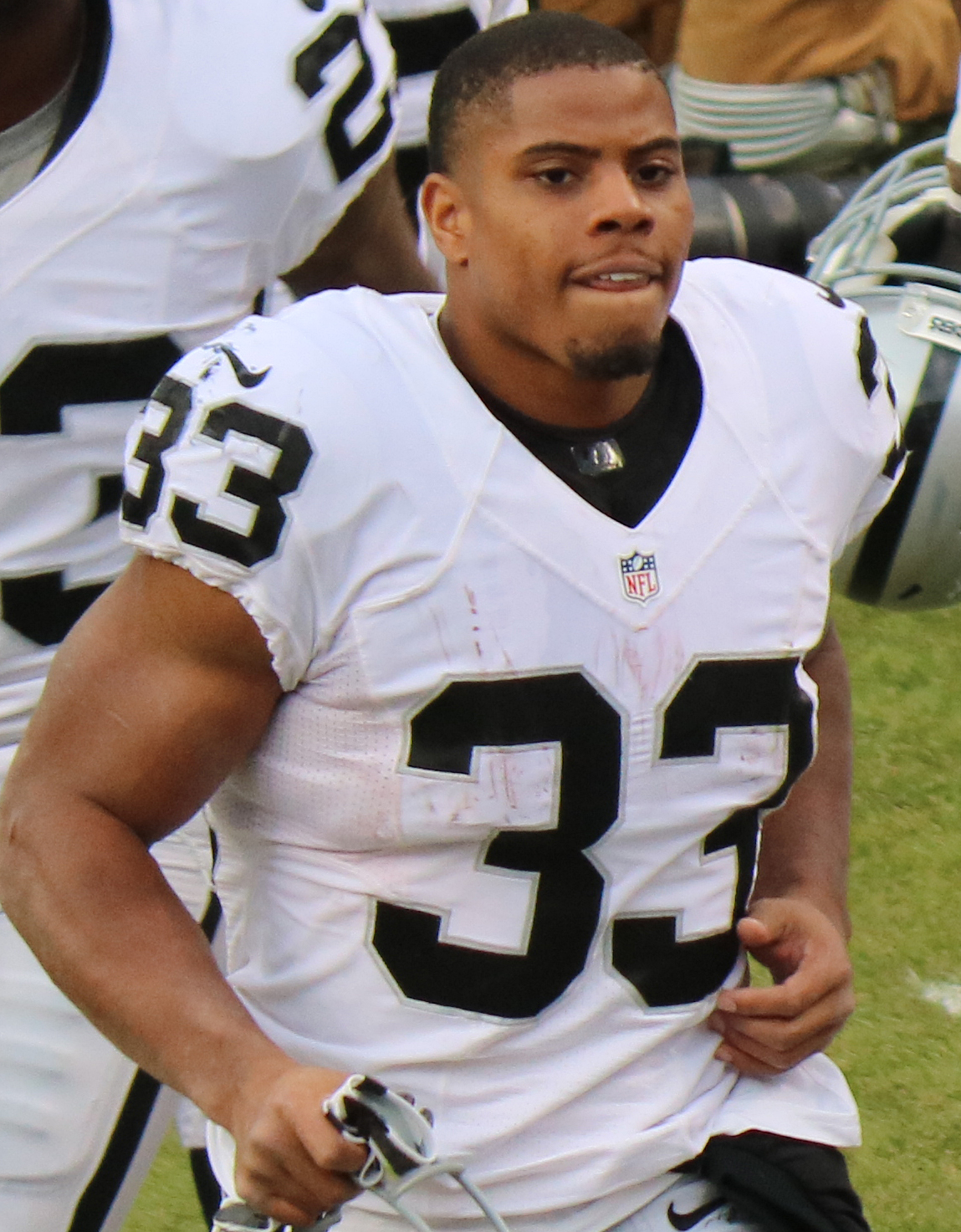
- Washington with the Oakland Raiders in 2017

No. 33, 30, 31
- Position: Running back

Personal information
- Born: February 22, 1993 (age 33); Dallas, Texas, U.S.
- Listed height: 5 ft 8 in (1.73 m)
- Listed weight: 210 lb (95 kg)

Career information
- High school: Thurgood Marshall (Missouri City, Texas)
- College: Texas Tech (2011–2015)
- NFL draft: 2016: 5th round, 143rd overall pick

Career history
- Oakland Raiders (2016–2019); Kansas City Chiefs (2020); Miami Dolphins (2020)

Awards and highlights
- Big 12 rushing yards leader (2015); First-team All-Big 12 (2015); Second-team All-Big 12 (2014)

Career NFL statistics
- Rushing yards: 1,213
- Rushing average: 3.9
- Rushing touchdowns: 7
- Receptions: 93
- Receiving yards: 643
- Receiving touchdowns: 1
- Stats at Pro Football Reference

DeAndré Washington (born February 22, 1993) is an American former professional football player who was a running back in the National Football League (NFL). He played college football for the Texas Tech Red Raiders and was selected by the Oakland Raiders of the National Football League (NFL) in the fifth round of the 2016 NFL draft. Washington also played for the Kansas City Chiefs and Miami Dolphins.

== Early life ==
Washington attended and played high school football at Thurgood Marshall High School. He committed to play college football at Texas Tech after receiving offers from schools such as Arizona, Baylor, Colorado, and Boise State.

== College career ==
Washington suffered a knee injury as a true freshman in 2011 after rushing for 366 yards and three touchdowns.

Washington redshirted in 2012 and came back and rushed for 450 yards and four touchdowns in 2013.

As a junior in 2014, Washington rushed for 1,103 yards and two touchdowns and finished with 328 receiving yards and two touchdowns.

As a senior, Washington rushed for 248 yards, including a career-long 80-yard touchdown run, against Kansas State on November 14, 2015. He finished his senior year leading the Big 12 Conference with 1,492 yards and 14 touchdowns along with 385 receiving yards and two touchdowns which was good enough for 1st-team All-Big 12 honors.

Washington finished his collegiate career fifth on Texas Tech's all-time rushing list behind Byron Hanspard, James Gray, Ricky Williams, and Bam Morris.

== Professional career ==
=== Pre-draft ===
Coming out of college, Washington was projected by many analysts to be a fifth to seventh round draft selection. He was rated the 16th best running back out of the 204 available by NFLDraftScout.com. Washington was invited to the NFL Combine and was able to complete the entire workout and all the positional drills. He was satisfied enough with his combine performance that he chose to only do positional drills at Texas Tech's Pro Day. Representatives and scouts from all 32 NFL teams showed up at the Pro Day to watch Washington, Jakeem Grant, Le'Raven Clark, and Branden Jackson.

Pre-draft measurables
Height	Weight	Arm length	Hand span	Wingspan	40-yard dash	10-yard split	20-yard split	20-yard shuttle	Three-cone drill	Vertical jump	Broad jump	Bench press
5 ft 8 1/4 in (1.73 m)	204 lb (93 kg)	30 in (0.76 m)	9 in (0.23 m)	6 ft 0 5/8 in (1.84 m)	4.49 s	1.50 s	2.61 s	4.20 s	7.03 s	34.5 in (0.88 m)	9 ft 10 in (3.00 m)	24 reps
All values from NFL Combine

=== Oakland Raiders ===
==== 2016 season ====
Washington was selected by the Raiders in the fifth round (143rd overall) in the 2016 NFL draft. The Raiders previously traded wide receiver Brice Butler to the Dallas Cowboys to obtain the selection used to select Washington.

On May 10, 2016, the Raiders signed Washington to a four-year, $2.60 million contract with a signing bonus of $269,195. He entered training camp competing for the backup running back position with George Atkinson III, Jalen Richard, Roy Helu, and Taiwan Jones. Washington was named the Raider's third running back on their depth chart behind Latavius Murray and Taiwan Jones.

Washington made his professional regular season debut in the narrow 35–34 season opening road victory over the New Orleans Saints, finishing with five carries for 14 yards and a 10-yard reception. Two weeks later, Washington had six carries for 57 yards and a five-yard reception in a 17–10 road victory over the Tennessee Titans.

On October 16, Washington earned his first career start during a 26–10 loss to the Kansas City Chiefs and finished the game with a season-high 10 carries for 49 yards. Washington scored his first two touchdowns in Week 16 against the Indianapolis Colts. He finished his rookie year with 87 carries for 467 yards and two touchdowns. During the Wild Card Round, Washington had four carries for 16 yards in the 27–14 road loss to the Houston Texans.

==== 2017 season ====
In the offseason leading into the 2017 season, the Raiders added veteran running back Marshawn Lynch to the backfield. The addition of Lynch limited Washington's production in 2017. Overall, he finished his second professional season with 57 carries for 153 yards and two touchdowns to go along with 34 receptions for 197 yards and a touchdown.

==== 2018 season ====
Under new head coach Jon Gruden, Washington's role remained similar to the previous season. In 10 games, he had 30 carries for 115 yards.

==== 2019 season ====
In the 2019 season, Washington had 108 carries for 387 yards and three touchdowns to go along with 36 receptions for 292 yards.

=== Kansas City Chiefs ===
On April 15, 2020, the Kansas City Chiefs signed Washington to a one-year contract. He was released on September 5, but was signed to the practice squad the next day. Washington was promoted to the active roster on October 8.

=== Miami Dolphins ===
On November 3, 2020, Washington and a seventh-round pick in the 2021 NFL draft were traded to the Miami Dolphins in exchange for a sixth-round draft pick.

== NFL career statistics ==
=== Regular season ===
Year	Team	Games		Rushing					Receiving					Returning					Fumbles	
Year	Team	GP	GS	Att	Yds	Avg	Lng	TD	Rec	Yds	Avg	Lng	TD	Ret	Yds	Avg	Lng	TD	Fum	Lost
2016	OAK	14	2	87	467	5.4	30	2	17	115	6.8	18	0	1	20	20.0	20	0	1	1
2017	OAK	15	0	57	153	2.7	11	2	34	197	5.8	15	1	5	86	17.2	26	0	2	1
2018	OAK	10	0	30	115	3.8	13	0	1	9	9.0	9	0	0	0	0	0	0	1	1
2019	OAK	16	3	108	387	3.6	36	3	36	292	8.1	28	0	0	0	0	0	0	0	0
2020	KC	1	0	3	5	1.7	3	0	1	2	2.0	2	0	0	0	0	0	0	0	0
2020	MIA	3	1	28	86	3.1	16	0	4	28	7.0	10	0	0	0	0	0	0	0	0
Career		59	6	313	1,213	3.9	36	7	94	643	6.9	28	1	6	106	17.7	26	0	4	3

=== Postseason ===
Year	Team	Games		Rushing					Receiving					Returning					Fumbles	
Year	Team	GP	GS	Att	Yds	Avg	Lng	TD	Rec	Yds	Avg	Lng	TD	Ret	Yds	Avg	Lng	TD	Fum	Lost
2016	OAK	1	0	4	16	4.0	14	0	0	0	0.0	0	0	0	0	0.0	0	0	0	0
Career		1	0	4	16	4.0	14	0	0	0	0.0	0	0	0	0	0.0	0	0	0	0
