= James Cowser =

American football player (born 1990)

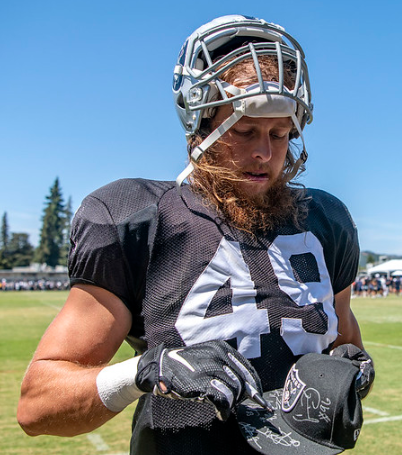
- James Cowser in 2019

Weber State Wildcats
- Title: Defensive ends coach

Personal information
- Born: September 13, 1990 (age 36); Fruit Heights, Utah, U.S.
- Listed height: 6 ft 3 in (1.91 m)
- Listed weight: 244 lb (111 kg)

Career information
- High school: Davis (Kaysville, Utah)
- College: Southern Utah
- NFL draft: 2016: undrafted

Career history

Playing
- Oakland Raiders (2016–2018)

Coaching
- Weber State (2021) Defensive assistant; Weber State (2022) Defensive ends coach; Utah Tech (2023) Defensive line coach & tight ends coach; Weber State (2024–present) Defensive ends coach

Career NFL statistics
- Total tackles: 32
- Sacks: 1
- Forced fumbles: 1
- Fumble recoveries: 3
- Stats at Pro Football Reference

James Cowser (born September 13, 1990) is an American former professional football outside linebacker and current college football coach. He is the defensive ends coach for Weber State University, a position he has held since 2024. He played college football at Southern Utah. Cowser was Football Championship Subdivision Defensive Player of the Year (2015). He held the official NCAA all-time sack record (42.5) until it was broken by Division II Slippery Rock’s Marcus Martin (56) in 2017.

== Professional career ==
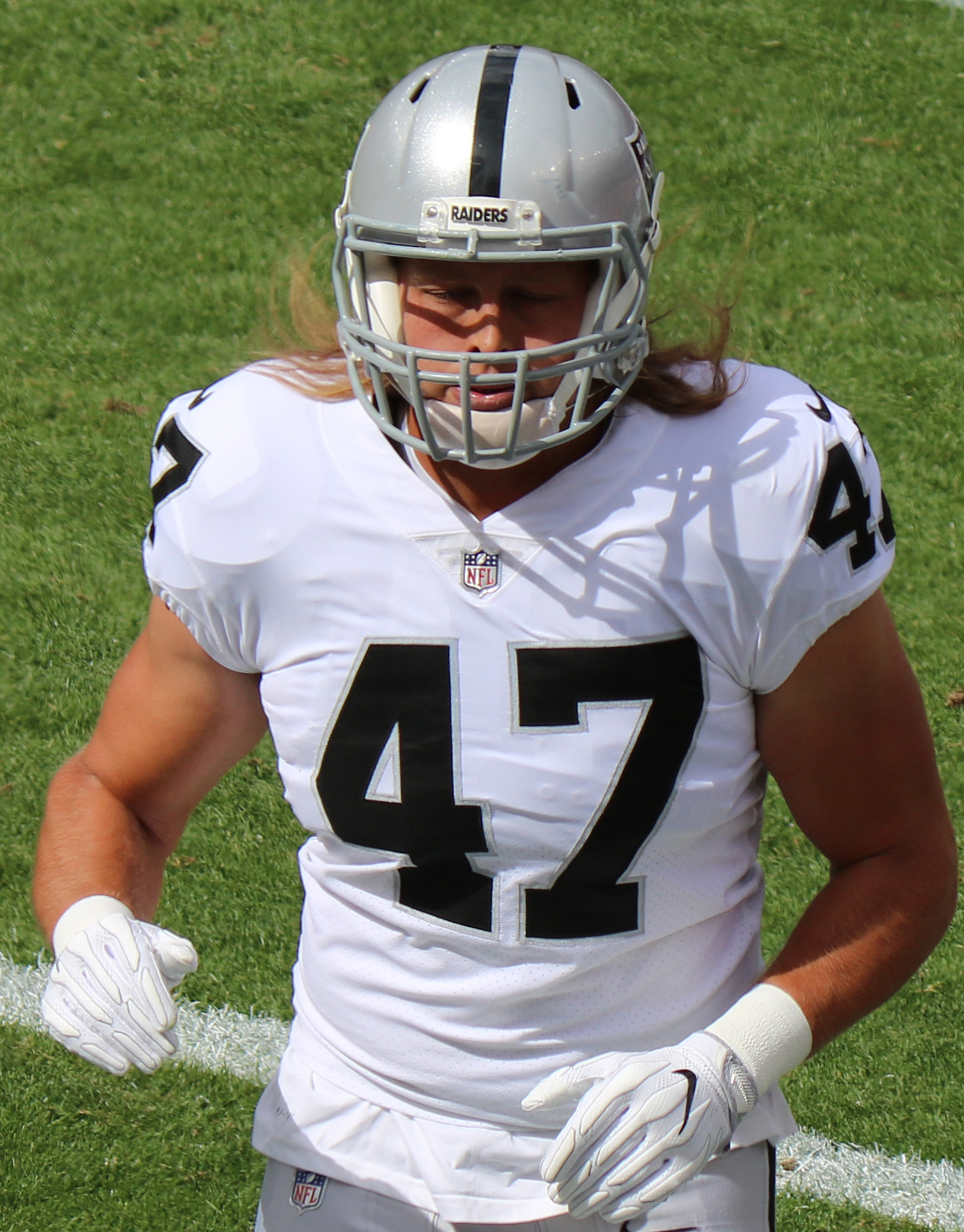
James Cowser in 2017

Cowser signed with the Oakland Raiders after going undrafted in the 2016 NFL draft. On September 3, 2016, he was waived/injured by the Raiders and placed on injured reserve. On September 10, Cowser was released from the Raiders' injured reserve. He was re–signed to the team's practice squad on October 4. Cowser was promoted to the active roster on November 26.

On September 1, 2018, Cowser was waived by the Raiders. He was re-signed to the practice squad on October 22. Cowser was promoted to the active roster on October 30. He was waived by the team on November 5, and was re-signed to the practice squad. Cowser was waived again on November 13, and later re-signed to the practice squad.

Cowser signed a reserve/future contract with the Raiders on January 1, 2019. He was waived by the team during final roster cuts on August 30.

== Coaching career ==
In the spring of 2021, Cowser joined Weber State as a defensive assistant under head coach Jay Hill. Cowser was promoted to a full-time position of defensive ends coach for the 2022 season. Following Hill's departure, Cowser joined Utah Tech as the defensive line coach and tight ends coach under head coach Paul Peterson. Following Peterson's firing, Cowser returned to Weber State, again as the defensive ends coach, this time under head coach Mickey Mental.

== Personal life ==
Cowser served as a missionary for the Church of Jesus Christ of Latter-day Saints in Hong Kong and Macau from 2009 to 2011.

Cowser is fluent in Mandarin Chinese and did an internship in NFL's China office in Shanghai.
