= Jamize Olawale =

American football player (born 1989)

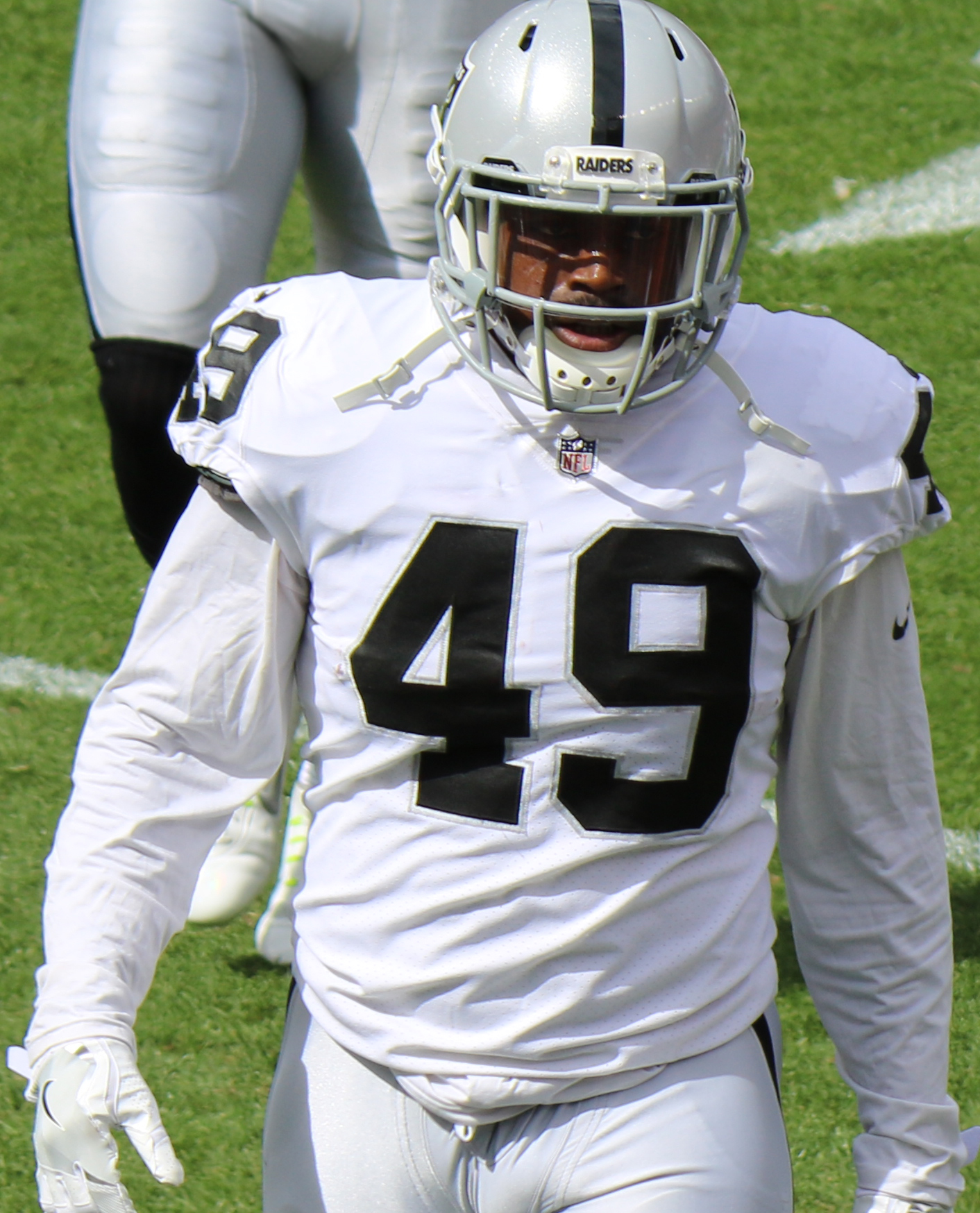
- Olawale with the Oakland Raiders in 2017

No. 49
- Position: Fullback

Personal information
- Born: April 17, 1989 (age 37); San Francisco, California, U.S.
- Listed height: 6 ft 1 in (1.85 m)
- Listed weight: 242 lb (110 kg)

Career information
- High school: Long Beach Polytechnic (Long Beach, California)
- College: Los Angeles Harbor (2007); El Camino (2008–2009); North Texas (2010–2011)
- NFL draft: 2012: undrafted

Career history
- Dallas Cowboys (2012)*; Oakland Raiders (2012–2017); Dallas Cowboys (2018–2020)
- * Offseason or practice squad member only

Career NFL statistics
- Rushing yards: 206
- Rushing average: 3.7
- Receptions: 41
- Receiving yards: 438
- Total touchdowns: 7
- Stats at Pro Football Reference

Jamize Robert Olawale (born April 17, 1989) is an American former professional football player who was a fullback in the National Football League (NFL). He played college football for the North Texas Mean Green and was signed by the Dallas Cowboys as an undrafted free agent in 2012.

== Early life ==
Olawale attended three high schools: Long Beach Poly High School, De La Salle High School, and St. Ignatius College Preparatory.

== College career ==
Olawale played two seasons at El Camino College as a tight end, recording 15 receptions for 338 yards and three touchdowns.

As a junior, he transferred to the University of North Texas, where he was switched to H-back, recording seven receptions for 79 yards. In his senior season, he was moved to wide receiver, appearing in eight games and recording two receptions for nine yards.

== Professional career ==
=== Dallas Cowboys (first stint) ===
After not being selected in the 2012 NFL draft, Olawale received a tryout invitation for rookie mini-camp where he was converted from wide receiver to full back, and performed well enough to be signed as an undrafted free agent on May 14.

Although he enjoyed a successful preseason, he was waived on August 31, after the team decided to keep Phillip Tanner. Olawale was then signed to the team's practice squad.

=== Oakland Raiders ===
On December 4, 2012, the Oakland Raiders hampered by injuries to running backs Darren McFadden and Mike Goodson, signed Olawale from the Dallas Cowboys practice squad. He appeared in three games during the season as a fullback.

Olawale would become a core special teams player. In 2013, he recorded eight special teams tackles (third on the team). In addition, he had seven receptions for 63 yards.

On December 21, 2014, he scored his first professional touchdown against the Buffalo Bills. In the next game, he had another receiving touchdown, this time against the Denver Broncos. He recorded 5 receptions for 18 yards, 2 receiving touchdowns and 7 special teams tackles.

On December 8, 2015, he was signed to a three-year contract extension. On November 8, against the Pittsburgh Steelers, he had a 19-yard rushing touchdown. He posted 24 carries for 110 rushing yards and a rushing touchdown to go along with nine receptions for 84 yards and 10 special teams tackles (led the team).

On November 21, 2016, against the Houston Texans, he had a 75-yard receiving touchdown from quarterback Derek Carr in the 27–20 victory at Azteca Stadium. He finished the season with 17 carries for 47 rushing yards, 12 receptions for 227 receiving yards, one receiving touchdown and 2 special teams tackles.

His production dipped in the 2017 season but he still recorded nine rushes for 43 yards and a rushing touchdown to go along with six receptions for 33 receiving yards and 3 special teams tackles.

=== Dallas Cowboys (second stint) ===
In March 2018, the Raiders traded Olawale and a 2018 sixth-round pick (#192-Jamil Demby) to the Dallas Cowboys in exchange for a fifth-round choice (#173-Johnny Townsend). He appeared in 16 games with 4 starts, registering 2 receptions for 13 yards and 13 special teams tackles (led the team).

On March 13, 2019, Olawale signed a three-year, $5.4 million contract extension with the Cowboys. He appeared in 16 games with 5 starts, collecting 5 special teams tackles (tied for fifth on the team). Although he was expected to contribute in the passing game, he could not record an offensive statistic during the season.

On March 10, 2020, Olawale's second-year option was exercised by the Cowboys. On August 2, 2020, Olawale announced he would opt out of the 2020 season due to the COVID-19 pandemic. He was released after the season on March 10, 2021.
