= K. J. Brent =

American football player (born 1993)

No. 15
- Position: Wide receiver

Personal information
- Born: August 6, 1993 (age 33); Waxhaw, North Carolina, U.S.
- Listed height: 6 ft 3 in (1.91 m)
- Listed weight: 202 lb (92 kg)

Career information
- High school: Marvin Ridge (Waxhaw, North Carolina)
- College: South Carolina (2011–2014); Wake Forest (2015)
- NFL draft: 2016: undrafted

Career history
- Oakland Raiders (2016–2017)*; Seattle Seahawks (2017)*; Indianapolis Colts (2017–2018); Tampa Bay Buccaneers (2018–2019)
- * Offseason or practice squad member only
- Stats at Pro Football Reference

Keith "K. J." Brent (born August 6, 1993) is an American former football wide receiver. He played college football at Wake Forest, and was signed by the Oakland Raiders as an undrafted free agent in 2016.

== College career ==
During his collegiate career, Brent played one year at Wake Forest University after playing three years at University of South Carolina. He graduated from South Carolina with a degree in Hotel, Restaurant, and Tourism Management.

== Professional career ==
=== Oakland Raiders ===
Brent signed with the Oakland Raiders as an undrafted free agent on May 10, 2016. He was waived on September 3, 2016 and was signed to the practice squad the next day. He signed a reserve/future contract with the Raiders on January 9, 2017.

On September 2, 2017, Brent was waived by the Raiders.

=== Seattle Seahawks ===
On September 27, 2017, Brent was signed to the Seattle Seahawks' practice squad. He was released by the team a few days later.

=== Indianapolis Colts ===
On October 24, 2017, Brent was signed to the Indianapolis Colts' practice squad. He was promoted to the active roster on December 2, 2017.

On September 1, 2018, Brent was waived/injured by the Colts and was placed on injured reserve. He was released on September 6, 2018. He was re-signed to the practice squad on October 16, 2018, but was released three days later.

=== Tampa Bay Buccaneers ===
On December 4, 2018, Brent was signed to the Tampa Bay Buccaneers practice squad.

Brent signed a reserve/future contract with the Buccaneers on December 31, 2018. He was waived/injured during final roster cuts on August 30, 2019, and reverted to the team's injured reserve list on September 1. He was released on October 9.
