= Jalen Richard =

American football player (born 1993)

No. 30
- Position: Running back

Personal information
- Born: October 15, 1993 (age 33); Baton Rouge, Louisiana, U.S.
- Listed height: 5 ft 8 in (1.73 m)
- Listed weight: 205 lb (93 kg)

Career information
- High school: Peabody Magnet (Alexandria, Louisiana)
- College: Southern Miss (2012–2015)
- NFL draft: 2016: undrafted

Career history
- Oakland / Las Vegas Raiders (2016–2021)

Career NFL statistics
- Rushing yards: 1,333
- Rushing average: 5.0
- Receptions: 191
- Receiving yards: 1,590
- Return yards: 1,632
- Total touchdowns: 7
- Stats at Pro Football Reference

Jalen Cantrell Richard (born October 15, 1993) is an American former professional football player who was a running back in the National Football League (NFL) for the Oakland / Las Vegas Raiders for six seasons. He played college football for the Southern Miss Golden Eagles and signed with the Oakland Raiders as an undrafted free agent in 2016.

== Early life ==
Richard was born in Baton Rouge, Louisiana, on October 15, 1993, to Krissy and James Richard. He has two younger brothers, Jeremy and Justin. Richard attended Peabody Magnet High School and participated in track and field and football.

== College career ==
Richard played college football at the University of Southern Mississippi from 2012 to 2015.

As a freshman, Richard rushed for 87 yards and two touchdowns in a loss at Central Florida. He finished the season with 87 carries for 426 yards and four touchdowns to go along with eight receptions for 39 yards and a touchdown.

As a sophomore in 2013, Richard had 85 carries for 326 yards and 21 receptions for 168 yards and a touchdown.

As a junior in 2014, Richard finished with 40 carries for 236 yards and a touchdown to go along with 24 receptions for 184 yards and a touchdown.

On September 19, 2015, Richard ran for 230 yards and four touchdowns in a victory at Texas State. On October 24, he had 114 rushing yards and a touchdown to go along with a 95-yard kick return touchdown against Charlotte. On November 21, Richard recorded 161 rushing yards and four touchdowns in a home victory over Old Dominion. As a senior, Richard's role expanded and he finished with 185 carries for 1,098 yards and 14 touchdowns to go along with 30 receptions for 284 yards and two touchdowns. Richard also had 23 returns for 232 yards and a touchdown.

Richard graduated from Southern Mississippi with a major in exercise science.

== Professional career ==
Pre-draft measurables
Height	Weight	Arm length	Hand span	Wingspan	40-yard dash	10-yard split	20-yard split	20-yard shuttle	Three-cone drill	Vertical jump	Broad jump	Bench press
5 ft 8 3/8 in (1.74 m)	207 lb (94 kg)	29 1/8 in (0.74 m)	8 7/8 in (0.23 m)	6 ft 1 in (1.85 m)	4.60 s	1.65 s	2.68 s	4.95 s	7.36 s	35.5 in (0.90 m)	9 ft 6 in (2.90 m)	13 reps
All values from Pro Day

=== 2016 season ===
After going undrafted in the 2016 NFL draft, Richard signed with the Oakland Raiders as an undrafted free agent. He decided to wear the #30 jersey in honor of a god-brother who was unable to continue playing football due to illness.

Richard made his NFL debut during the narrow season-opening 35–34 comeback road victory over the New Orleans Saints, recording three carries for 84 yards and a 75-yard touchdown to go along with two receptions for 11 yards. The 75-yard score came on his first career carry, and Richard became just the fourth player to have a touchdown run of 75 yards or more in his NFL debut (Oran Pape in 1930, Alan Ameche in 1955, and Ottis Anderson in 1979). Three weeks later against the Baltimore Ravens, Richard had two carries for 15 yards and a five-yard reception to go along with six returns for 138 yards in the narrow 28–27 road victory.

During a Week 5 34–31 victory over the San Diego Chargers, Richard had eight carries for 31 yards and caught six passes for a season-high 66 yards. In the next game against the Kansas City Chiefs, he recorded four carries for seven yards and two receptions for five yards to go along with four returns for 108 yards during the 26–10 loss. Two weeks later against the Tampa Bay Buccaneers, he had five carries for 34 yards and five returns for 58 yards in the 30–24 overtime road victory.

During Week 9 against the Denver Broncos on Sunday Night Football, Richard recorded eight carries for 62 yards and two receptions for 10 yards to go along with five returns for 52 yards in the 30–20 victory. Following a Week 10 bye, the Raiders faced the Houston Texans at Estadio Azteca in Mexico on Monday Night Football. Richard finished the 27–20 victory with three carries for two yards to go along with three receptions for 50 yards and a touchdown. In the next game against the Carolina Panthers, he had seven carries for 23 yards and seven returns for 80 yards during the 35–32 victory.

During a Week 13 38–24 victory over the Buffalo Bills, Richard had a season-high nine carries for 53 yards and three returns for 39 yards. Three weeks later against the Indianapolis Colts, he recorded six carries for 66 yards and three receptions for 13 yards and a touchdown to go along with three returns for 52 yards in the 33–25 victory.

Richard finished his rookie year with 83 carries for 491 yards and a touchdown to go along with 29 receptions for 194 yards and two touchdowns. He also had 51 returns for 708 yards. The Raiders finished second in the AFC West with a 12–4 record and qualified for the playoffs. During the Wild Card Round against the Texans, Richard had three carries for three yards and two receptions for eight yards to go along with seven returns for 106 yards in the 27–14 road loss.

=== 2017 season ===
During a Week 2 45–20 victory over the New York Jets, Richard recorded six carries for 58 yards and a 52-yard touchdown to go along with two receptions for 51 yards and a 13-yard return. Three weeks later against the Ravens, he had a season-high nine carries for 37 yards in the 30–17 loss.

During Week 6 against the Los Angeles Chargers, Richard had three receptions for 27 yards and five returns for 47 yards in the narrow 17–16 loss. In the next game against the Chiefs on Thursday Night Football, he caught four passes for 45 yards and rushed for 31 yards while tying his season-high of nine carries during the narrow 31–30 victory. The following week against the Bills, Richard made his first career start due to Marshawn Lynch's suspension. Richard finished the 34–14 road loss with five carries for 21 yards and five receptions for 35 yards to go along with five returns for 47 yards.

During a Week 12 21–14 victory over the Broncos, Richard recorded two carries for 17 yards and two receptions for 13 yards and a touchdown to go along with four returns for 25 yards. In the next game against the New York Giants, he had a four-yard carry and a five-yard reception to go along with five returns for 40 yards during the 24–17 victory. Three weeks later against the Philadelphia Eagles on Christmas, Richard recorded four carries for 42 yards and two receptions for 14 yards to go along with four returns for 48 yards in the 19–10 road loss.

Richard finished his second professional season with 56 carries for 275 yards and a touchdown to go along with 27 receptions for 256 yards and a touchdown. He also had 34 returns for 245 yards.

=== 2018 season ===
Under new head coach Jon Gruden, Richard saw an expanded role in the receiving game in the 2018 season.

Richard began the season with five carries for 24 yards and a season-high nine receptions for 55 yards in the season-opening 33–13 loss to the Los Angeles Rams. During Week 9 against the San Francisco 49ers on Thursday Night Football, he made his first and only start of the season and finished the 34–3 road loss with two carries for four yards and four receptions for 45 yards. Two weeks later against the Arizona Cardinals, Richard had a season-high 11 carries for 61 yards and three receptions for 32 yards in the narrow 23–21 road victory.

During a Week 13 40–33 loss the Chiefs, Richard had six carries for a season-high 95 yards and three receptions for 31 yards. Two weeks later against the Cincinnati Bengals, he recorded four carries for nine yards to go along with five receptions for a season-high 67 yards in the 30–16 road loss. In the next game against the Broncos on Monday Night Football, Richard had four carries for 11 yards and his only touchdown of the season to go along with four receptions for 40 yards during the 27–14 victory.

Richard finished the 2018 season with 68 receptions for 607 yards to go along with 55 carries for 259 yards and a touchdown.

=== 2019 season ===
On March 7, 2019, the Raiders placed a second-round restricted free agent tender on Richard.

During a Week 9 31–24 victory over the Detroit Lions, Richard rushed twice for 12 yards and caught three passes for a season-high 56 yards. In the next game against the Chargers on Thursday Night Football, he had four receptions for 43 yards during the narrow 26–24 victory. Two weeks later against the Jets, Richard recorded two carries for four yards and a season-high six receptions for 47 yards in the 34–3 road loss.

During Week 13 against the Chiefs, Richard had a two-yard carry and a six-yard reception to go along with three returns for 60 yards in the 40–9 road loss. In the next game against the Tennessee Titans, he recorded season-highs in rushing with seven carries for 28 yards to go along with two receptions for 18 yards and five returns for 103 yards during the 42–21 loss. The following week against the Jacksonville Jaguars, Richard had an 11-yard carry and two receptions for 25 yards to go along with three returns for 39 yards in the 20–16 loss.

Richard finished the 2019 season with 39 carries for 145 yards to go along with 36 receptions for 323 yards. He also had 15 returns for 209 yards.

=== 2020 season ===
On February 5, 2020, Richard signed a two-year contract extension with the Raiders.

During Week 2 against the Saints on Monday Night Football, Richard lost a fumble early in the fourth quarter, but later rushed for a 20-yard touchdown to help secure a 34–24 victory for the Raiders. He finished the game with two carries for a season-high 26 yards and the aforementioned touchdown to go along with a 30-yard return. During a Week 9 31–26 road victory over the Chargers, Richard recorded a three-yard carry and a 19-yard reception to go along with two returns for 76 yards. He was placed on the reserve/COVID-19 list on December 30, 2020.

Richard finished the 2020 season with 22 carries for 123 yards and a touchdown to go along with 19 receptions for 138 yards. He also returned 10 kicks for 240 yards.

=== 2021 season ===
On September 2, 2021, Richard was placed on injured reserve. He was activated on October 9.

Richard made his season debut in Week 5 against the Chicago Bears and finished the 20–9 loss with a four-yard reception. During a Week 9 23–16 road loss to the Giants, Richard recorded two receptions for 18 yards and five returns for 107 yards. In the next game against the Chiefs, he had a three-yard reception and three returns for 60 yards during the 41–14 loss.

Richard finished the 2021 season with nine carries for 40 yards to go along with 12 receptions for 72 yards. He also returned 11 kicks for 227 yards. The Raiders finished second in the AFC West with a 10–7 record and qualified for the playoffs. During the Wild Card Round against the Bengals, Richard recorded a four-yard reception during the 26–19 road loss.

=== Retirement ===
On July 17, 2024, Richard announced his retirement from the NFL at age 30 after being a free agent for the 2022 and 2023 seasons.

== Career statistics ==
=== NFL ===
==== Regular season ====
Year	Team	Games		Rushing					Receiving					Returning					Fumbles	
Year	Team	GP	GS	Att	Yds	Avg	Lng	TD	Rec	Yds	Avg	Lng	TD	Ret	Yds	Avg	Lng	TD	Fum	Lost
2016	OAK	16	0	83	491	5.9	75T	1	29	194	6.7	29	2	51	708	13.9	50	0	0	0
2017	OAK	16	1	56	275	4.9	52T	1	27	257	9.5	39	1	34	245	7.2	19	0	8	3
2018	OAK	16	1	55	259	4.7	30	1	68	607	8.9	32	0	2	3	1.5	3	0	3	2
2019	OAK	16	0	39	145	3.7	13	0	36	323	9.0	33	0	15	209	13.9	29	0	2	0
2020	LV	13	0	22	123	5.6	20	1	19	138	7.3	19	0	10	240	24.0	44	0	0	0
2021	LV	10	0	9	40	4.4	23	0	12	72	6.0	19	0	11	227	20.6	32	0	0	0
Career		87	2	264	1,333	5.0	75T	4	191	1,590	8.3	39	3	123	1,632	20.9	50	0	13	5

==== Postseason ====
Year	Team	Games		Rushing					Receiving					Returning					Fumbles	
Year	Team	GP	GS	Att	Yds	Avg	Lng	TD	Rec	Yds	Avg	Lng	TD	Ret	Yds	Avg	Lng	TD	Fum	Lost
2016	OAK	1	0	3	3	1.0	4	0	2	8	4.0	5	0	7	106	15.1	37	0	0	0
2021	LV	1	0	0	0	0.0	0	0	1	4	4.0	4	0	0	0	0.0	0	0	0	0
Career		2	0	3	3	1.0	4	0	3	12	4.0	5	0	7	106	15.1	37	0	0	0

=== College ===
Year	School	Conf	Class	Pos	G	Rushing				Receiving			
Year	School	Conf	Class	Pos	G	Att	Yds	Avg	TD	Rec	Yds	Avg	TD
2012	Southern Miss	CUSA	FR	RB	10	87	426	4.9	4	8	39	4.9	1
2013	Southern Miss	CUSA	SO	RB	11	85	326	3.8	0	21	168	8.0	1
2014	Southern Miss	CUSA	JR	RB	7	40	236	5.9	1	24	184	7.7	1
2015	Southern Miss	CUSA	SR	RB	13	185	1098	5.9	14	30	284	9.5	2
Career	Southern Miss				41	397	2086	5.3	19	83	675	8.1	5
