= Branden Jackson =

American football player (born 1992)

Profile
- Position: Defensive end

Personal information
- Born: November 11, 1992 (age 33); McKeesport, Pennsylvania, U.S.
- Listed height: 6 ft 4 in (1.93 m)
- Listed weight: 295 lb (134 kg)

Career information
- High school: McKeesport Area
- College: Texas Tech
- NFL draft: 2016: undrafted

Career history
- Oakland Raiders (2016); Seattle Seahawks (2017–2020)

Career NFL statistics
- Total tackles: 42
- Sacks: 3.5
- Pass deflections: 3
- Stats at Pro Football Reference

Branden Jackson (born November 11, 1992) is an American former professional football player who was a defensive end in the National Football League (NFL). He played college football for the Texas Tech Red Raiders.

== College career ==
Jackson played four years at Texas Tech, appearing in 51 games with 38 starts, totalling 138 tackles, 11 sacks, three forced fumbles, two fumble recoveries, and one pass defensed.

== Professional career ==
Pre-draft measurables
Height	Weight	Arm length	Hand span	40-yard dash	20-yard shuttle	Three-cone drill	Vertical jump	Broad jump	Bench press
6 ft 3 7/8 in (1.93 m)	273 lb (124 kg)	33 3/8 in (0.85 m)	10 1/4 in (0.26 m)	5.06 s	4.77 s	7.40 s	31.5 in (0.80 m)	9 ft 5 in (2.87 m)	20 reps
All values from NFL Combine

=== Oakland Raiders ===
Jackson signed with the Oakland Raiders as an undrafted free agent on May 16, 2016. He was released by the Raiders on September 3, 2016 and was signed to the practice squad the next day. On December 3, 2016, he was promoted to the active roster.

On September 2, 2017, Jackson was waived by the Raiders.

=== Seattle Seahawks ===
On September 26, 2017, Jackson was signed to the Seattle Seahawks' practice squad. He was promoted to the active roster on October 7, 2017.

On September 2, 2018, Jackson was waived by the Seahawks and was re-signed to the practice squad. He was promoted to the active roster on September 25, 2018.

Jackson re-signed with the Seahawks on April 23, 2020. He was released on July 26, 2020, but was re-signed on August 6. He was placed on injured reserve due to a career ending neck injury on August 30, 2020.
