= David Chesnoff =

American defense lawyer (born 1955)

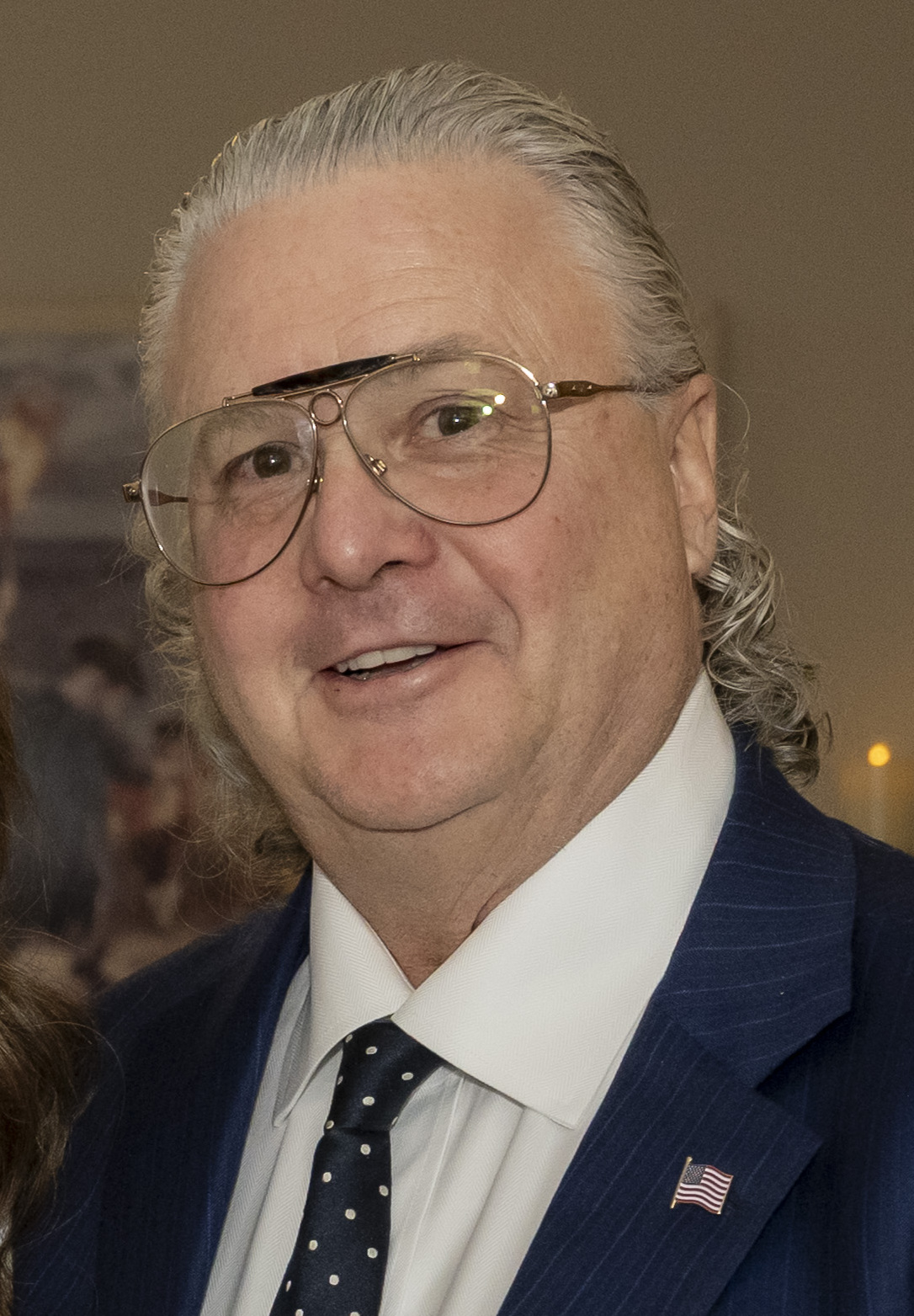
- Chesnoff in 2025
- Born: May 13, 1955 (age 71); Paterson, New Jersey
- Education: Suffolk University (J.D. 1979); Alfred University (B.A. 1976)
- Occupation: Criminal defense attorney

David Zeltner Chesnoff (born May 13, 1955) is an American criminal defense attorney based in Las Vegas. Chesnoff was a law partner of Oscar Goodman, who served three terms as Mayor of Las Vegas. Chesnoff has represented celebrities as well as crime figures.

Goodman and Chesnoff met in 1985 and formed the law firm Goodman & Chesnoff. Based in Las Vegas, the duo appeared in courtrooms across the United States for their clients. Goodman was elected Mayor of Las Vegas and remained a partner until 2001. After Goodman went into politics, the firm changed its name to Chesnoff & Schonfeld, and Richard A. Schonfeld became a named partner. David Chesnoff, now runs the Las Vegas firm, Chesnoff & Schonfeld with partner Richard A. Schonfeld. Robert Z. DeMarco is also an associate attorney with the law firm.

Chesnoff and Schonfeld is listed as one of the country's top criminal law firms by The National Directory of Criminal Lawyers. Chesnoff has been featured on "48 Hours," "Nancy Grace," "ABC's Nightly News," "Charlie Rose Show," A&E's "American Justice" and City Confidential. The firm carries the highest legal ability rating in Martindale-Hubbell.

== Awards / Honors ==
=== AFHU Scopus Award ===
Chesnoff was recognized with the 2024 American Friends of the Hebrew University Scopus Award on January 20, 2024.

=== National Security Advisor Council ===
Chesnoff was one of twenty-two members appointed by President Donald J. Trump and Secretary Noem to The Homeland Security Advisory Council (HSAC) on June 9, 2025.

== Notable clients ==
=== Musicians, entertainers, sports stars and actors ===
Jeff Ross, Philthy Rich, Martin Wendel, Cristiano Ronaldo, Henry Ruggs III, Vince Neil, Bruno Mars, Michael Jackson's family, Leonardo DiCaprio, David Copperfield, Shaquille O'Neal, Andre Agassi, Britney Spears, Mike Tyson, Martha Stewart, Jamie Foxx, Lindsay Lohan, Scott Weiland of the Stone Temple Pilots, Nate Dogg, Suge Knight, Paris Hilton, Alistair Overeem, Charles Oakley, Jarret Stoll, and Chumlee.

=== Poker stars ===
Phil Ivey, Doyle Brunson, Johnny Chan, Shawn Sheikhan, David "Chip" Reese, "The Mouth" Matusow, Kenna James, Wei Seng "Paul" Phua, and Dan Bilzerian.

=== Others ===
- Nebraska philanthropist, Terrance Watanabe, in the largest alleged check fraud case in Clark County, Nevada history.
- Represented Salvatore Scafidi, alleged Scarfo, organized crime family member in a death penalty case, and he was acquitted.
- Represented U.S. District Court Judge Harry Claiborne in a U.S. Senate Impeachment trial.
- David Kulik in the United States District Court for the Central District of California in a fifteen-ton hashish case, and received a decision of acquittal based on the legal argument of jurisdictional entrapment.
- Former HBO Chairman, Chris Albrecht.
- Alleged Hells Angel members.
- Former Biloxi, Mississippi mayor Pete Halat.
- Businessman Juan Bravo in a trial with Senator Héctor Martínez Maldonado from Puerto Rico in 2010.
- Represented Reno millionaire, Darren Mack in a controversial murder trial. Darren Mack's case was the topic of an NBC special entitled "Killings in the biggest little city."
- Chesnoff has handled some of the largest controlled substances cases in American history. For example, Chesnoff represented a defendant in U.S. v. Hector Tapia.
- Robert Durst - co-counsel in the case of State of California v. Robert Durst.
- Tom Alexandrovich - Israeli civil servant

David Chesnoff appeared on the Charlie Rose show with John Gotti attorney, Albert Krieger, to discuss topics ranging from the attorney-client privilege to the infamous Cali Cartel indictments.
