= 2020 Las Vegas Raiders season =

61st season in franchise history, first in Las Vegas

- Logo commemorating the Raiders' inaugural season in Las Vegas
- Owner: Mark Davis
- General manager: Mike Mayock
- Head coach: Jon Gruden
- Home stadium: Allegiant Stadium

Results
- Record: 8–8
- Division place: 2nd AFC West
- Playoffs: Did not qualify
- Pro Bowlers: RB Josh Jacobs; TE Darren Waller

Uniform
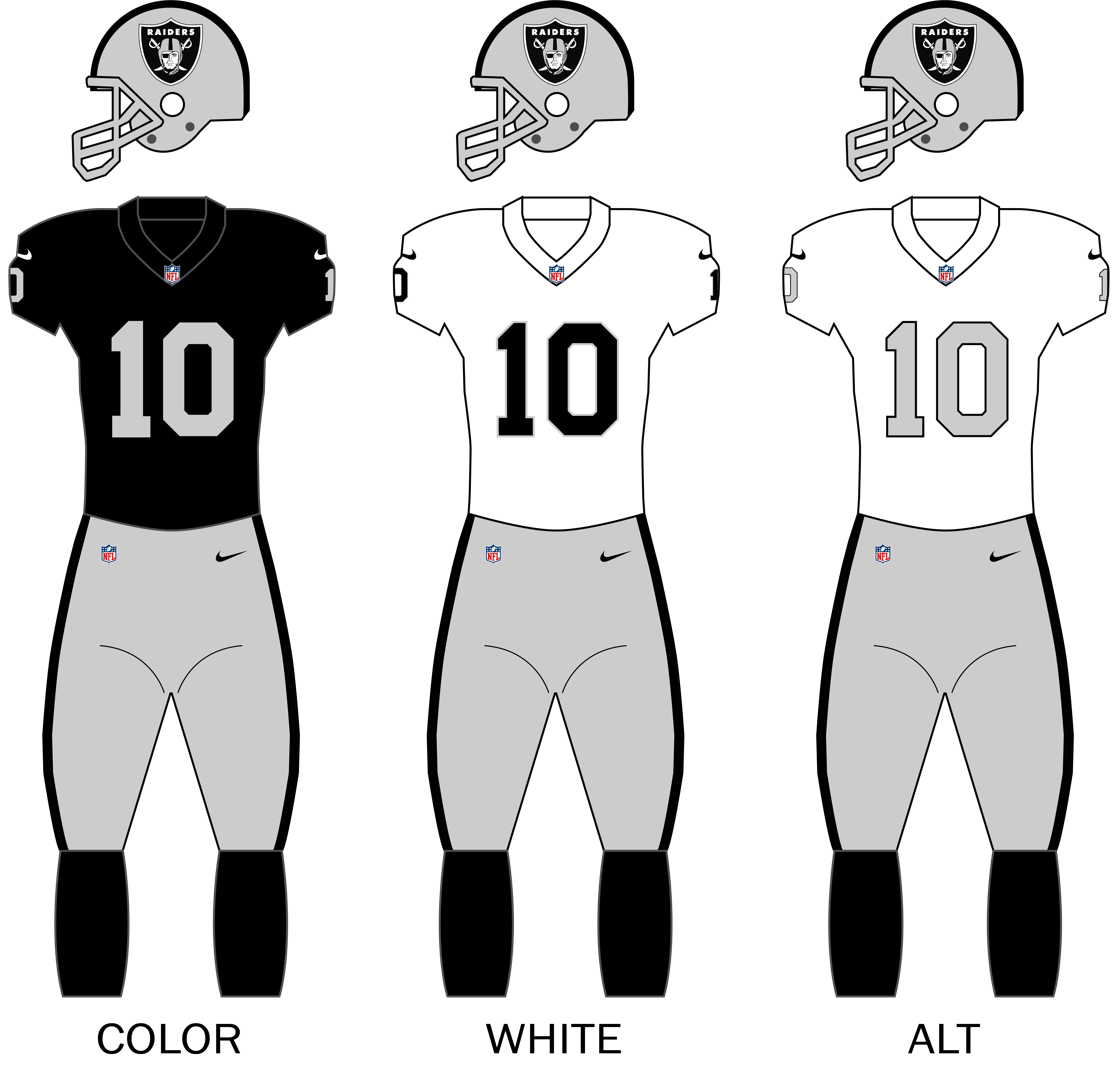

The 2020 season was the Las Vegas Raiders' 51st in the National Football League (NFL), their 61st overall, and their first in the Las Vegas metropolitan area, as well as their first to not take place in California. The Raiders began playing their home games in the brand-new Allegiant Stadium. The season was the third under head coach Jon Gruden since his rehiring by the organization (seventh overall) and final full season as a head coach.

With a Week 17 victory over the Denver Broncos the Raiders improved on their 7–9 record from the previous season finishing 8–8. With two wins, the Raiders became the third team originating in the American Football League to reach 500 all-time wins. However despite a 6–3 start with wins against the Chiefs, Saints, and Browns, all of whom would go on to make the playoffs, the Raiders suffered a late-season collapse for the second consecutive year, losing five of their last seven games and after a devastating loss to the Dolphins in week 16, they were eliminated from playoff contention for the fourth consecutive year.

As a result of the COVID-19 pandemic at the time, all games at Allegiant Stadium took place without fans. Las Vegas also went 2–6 at home this season, while going 6–2 on the road.

== Relocation ==
On January 22, 2020, the Raiders officially announced their relocation to Las Vegas. This marked the third re-location of the franchise and made the 2020 season the team's first ever season as the only professional football team in its metropolitan area. The team shared the Bay Area market with the San Francisco 49ers during both of its tenures in Oakland, and shared the Los Angeles market with the Los Angeles Rams during its 13-year stint in Southern California.

== Roster transactions ==
=== Free agents signed ===
Position	Player	Age	2019 team
QB	Marcus Mariota	26	Tennessee Titans
LB	Cory Littleton	26	Los Angeles Rams
TE	Jason Witten	37	Dallas Cowboys
DE	Carl Nassib	26	Tampa Bay Buccaneers
DT	Maliek Collins	24	Dallas Cowboys
S	Jeff Heath	28	Dallas Cowboys
MLB	Nick Kwiatkoski	26	Chicago Bears
G	Eric Kush	30	Cleveland Browns
TE	Nick O'Leary	27	Jacksonville Jaguars
WR	Nelson Agholor	26	Philadelphia Eagles
DT	Daniel Ross	27	Dallas Cowboys
S	Damarious Randall	27	Cleveland Browns
CB	Prince Amukamara	30	Chicago Bears

=== Players released ===
Position	Player	Age	2020 team
LB	Tahir Whitehead	29	Carolina Panthers

=== Draft ===
2020 Las Vegas Raiders Draft
Round	Selection	Player	Position	College	Notes
1	12	Henry Ruggs	WR	Alabama	
1	19	Damon Arnette	CB	Ohio State	from Chicago Bears
3	80	Lynn Bowden	WR	Kentucky	
3	81	Bryan Edwards	WR	South Carolina	from Chicago Bears
3	100	Tanner Muse	ILB	Clemson	from New England Patriots
4	109	John Simpson	OG	Clemson	from Detroit Lions
4	139	Amik Robertson	CB	Louisiana Tech	from Tampa Bay Buccaneers via New England Patriots

Notes

- The Chicago Bears traded first- and third-round selections as well as 2019 first- and sixth-round selections to the Raiders in exchange for defensive end/outside linebacker Khalil Mack, a second-round selection, and a seventh-round conditional selection (condition unknown), originally a fifth-round selection.
- The Raiders traded picks 91 and 159 to the New England Patriots in exchange for picks 100, 139 and 172.
- The Raiders traded picks 121 and 172 to the Detroit Lions in exchange for pick 109.

==== Undrafted free agents ====
Player	Position	College
Nick Bowers	TE	Penn State
Madre Harper	CB	Southern Illinois
Siaosi Mariner	WR	Utah State
Mike Panasiuk	DT	Michigan State
Kamaal Seymour	OT	Rutgers
Javin White	LB	UNLV

== Staff ==
2020 Las Vegas Raiders staff
Front office: Owner – Carol and Mark Davis; President – Marc Badain; Executive vice president/general counsel – Dan Ventrelle; General manager – Mike Mayock; Senior vice president/director of football administration – Tom Delaney; Assistant director of player personnel – DuJuan Daniels; Assistant director of player personnel – Trey Scott; Director of pro personnel – Dwayne Joseph; Director of college scouting – Jim Abrams; Assistant director of college scouting – Teddy Atlas; Senior advisor to the owner and president – Marcel Reece; Senior advisor to the general manager – Walter Juliff; Head coaches: Head coach – Jon Gruden; Assistant head coach/special teams coordinator – Rich Bisaccia; Offensive coaches: Offensive coordinator – Greg Olson; Senior offensive assistant – John Morton; Running backs – Kirby Wilson; Wide receivers – Edgar Bennett; Tight ends – Frank Smith; Offensive line – Tom Cable; Quality control-offense – Tim Berbenich; Quality control-offense – Nick Holz; Offensive quality control – Cameron Clemmons; Offensive quality control – Austin King	Defensive coaches: Interim defensive coordinator/defensive line – Rod Marinelli; Assistant defensive line – Travis Smith; Linebackers – David Lippincott; Defensive backs – Jim O'Neil; Assistant defensive backs – Taver Johnson; Special teams coaches: Assistant special teams – Byron Storer; Strength and conditioning: Head strength and conditioning – A. J. Neibel; Strength and conditioning assistant – D'Anthony Batiste; Strength and conditioning assistant – Deuce Gruden; Strength and conditioning assistant – Rick Slate; Nutritionist – Ricky Ng

== Final roster ==
2020 Las Vegas Raiders roster
Quarterbacks (QB): 4 Derek Carr; 8 Marcus Mariota; 3 Nathan Peterman; Running backs (RB): 23 Devontae Booker; 45 Alec Ingold FB; 28 Josh Jacobs; 35 Theo Riddick; Wide receivers (WR): 15 Nelson Agholor; 89 Bryan Edwards; 12 Zay Jones; 13 Hunter Renfrow PR; 11 Henry Ruggs; Tight ends (TE): 85 Derek Carrier; 87 Foster Moreau; 83 Darren Waller; 82 Jason Witten	Offensive linemen (OL): 77 Trent Brown T; 71 Denzelle Good G; 61 Rodney Hudson C; 66 Gabe Jackson G; 68 Andre James C; 74 Kolton Miller T; 75 Brandon Parker T; 76 John Simpson G; 70 Sam Young T; Defensive linemen (DL): 51 Vic Beasley DE; 97 Maliek Collins DT; 98 Maxx Crosby DE; 90 Johnathan Hankins DT; 73 Maurice Hurst Jr. DT; 99 Arden Key DE; 94 Carl Nassib DE; 92 Chris Smith DE; 91 Kendal Vickers DE	Linebackers (LB): 42 Cory Littleton OLB; 54 Raekwon McMillan MLB; 50 Nicholas Morrow OLB; 58 Kyle Wilber OLB; Defensive backs (DB): 24 Johnathan Abram SS; 20 Damon Arnette CB; 25 Erik Harris FS; 38 Jeff Heath SS; 31 Isaiah Johnson CB; 29 Lamarcus Joyner CB; 26 Nevin Lawson CB; 32 Dallin Leavitt FS; 27 Trayvon Mullen CB; 22 Keisean Nixon CB; 21 Amik Robertson CB; 36 Daryl Worley CB; Special teams (ST): 2 Daniel Carlson K; 6 A. J. Cole III P; 47 Trent Sieg LS	Practice squad: 88 Marcell Ateman WR; 49 Nick Bowers TE; 18 Keelan Doss WR; 5 Dominik Eberle K; 10 Rico Gafford WR; 33 Rashaan Gaulden S; 52 Gerri Green DE; 95 David Irving DE; 72 Jaryd Jones-Smith T; 62 Erik Magnuson C; 59 James Onwualu LB; 93 Niles Scott DT; 63 Kamaal Seymour T; 34 Kemah Siverand S; 53 Javin White MLB; Reserve: 54 Ukeme Eligwe OLB (Opt-out); 96 Clelin Ferrell DE (IR); 64 Richie Incognito G (IR); 34 D. J. Killings CB (Opt-out); 44 Nick Kwiatkoski MLB (COVID-19); 56 Takkarist McKinley DE (IR/DFR); 55 Tanner Muse OLB (IR); 84 Nick O'Leary TE (NF-Inj.); 30 Jalen Richard RB (COVID-19); 95 Jeremiah Valoaga DE (Opt-out); 16 Tyrell Williams WR (IR); Rookies in italics 52 active, 12 reserve, 15 practice squad

== Preseason ==
The Raiders' preseason schedule was announced on May 7, but was later cancelled due to the COVID-19 pandemic.

Week	Date	Opponent	Venue	Result
1	August 13	at Seattle Seahawks	CenturyLink Field	Cancelled due to the COVID-19 pandemic
2	August 21	at San Francisco 49ers	Levi's Stadium	Cancelled due to the COVID-19 pandemic
3	August 27	Arizona Cardinals	Allegiant Stadium	Cancelled due to the COVID-19 pandemic
4	September 3	Los Angeles Rams	Allegiant Stadium	Cancelled due to the COVID-19 pandemic

== Regular season ==
=== Schedule ===
The Raiders' 2020 schedule was announced on May 7.

Week	Date	Opponent	Result	Record	Venue	Recap
1	September 13	at Carolina Panthers	**W** 34–30	1–0	Bank of America Stadium	Recap
2	September 21	New Orleans Saints	**W** 34–24	2–0	Allegiant Stadium	Recap
3	September 27	at New England Patriots	**L** 20–36	2–1	Gillette Stadium	Recap
4	October 4	Buffalo Bills	**L** 23–30	2–2	Allegiant Stadium	Recap
5	October 11	at **Kansas City Chiefs**	**W** 40–32	3–2	Arrowhead Stadium	Recap
6	Bye					
7	October 25	Tampa Bay Buccaneers	**L** 20–45	3–3	Allegiant Stadium	Recap
8	November 1	at Cleveland Browns	**W** 16–6	4–3	FirstEnergy Stadium	Recap
9	November 8	at **Los Angeles Chargers**	**W** 31–26	5–3	SoFi Stadium	Recap
10	November 15	**Denver Broncos**	**W** 37–12	6–3	Allegiant Stadium	Recap
11	November 22	**Kansas City Chiefs**	**L** 31–35	6–4	Allegiant Stadium	Recap
12	November 29	at Atlanta Falcons	**L** 6–43	6–5	Mercedes-Benz Stadium	Recap
13	December 6	at New York Jets	**W** 31–28	7–5	MetLife Stadium	Recap
14	December 13	Indianapolis Colts	**L** 27–44	7–6	Allegiant Stadium	Recap
15	December 17	**Los Angeles Chargers**	**L** 27–30 (OT)	7–7	Allegiant Stadium	Recap
16	December 26	Miami Dolphins	**L** 25–26	7–8	Allegiant Stadium	Recap
17	January 3	at **Denver Broncos**	**W** 32–31	8–8	Empower Field at Mile High	Recap

Note: Intra-division opponents are in bold text.

=== Game summaries ===
==== Week 1: at Carolina Panthers ====
Week One: Las Vegas Raiders at Carolina Panthers – Game summary

Quarter	1	2	3	4	Total
**Raiders**	7	10	10	7	**34**
Panthers	9	6	0	15	**30**

at Bank of America Stadium, Charlotte, North Carolina

- Date: September 13
- Game time: 1:00 p.m. EDT/10:00 a.m. PDT
- Game weather: Mostly sunny, 81 °F (27 °C)
- Game attendance: 0
- Referee: Brad Allen
- TV announcers (CBS): Greg Gumbel, Rich Gannon and Jay Feely
- Recap, Game Book

Game information

**First quarter**

- CAR – Joey Slye 47-yard field goal, 10:07. Panthers 3–0. **Drive: 6 plays, 34 yards, 4:02.**
- LV – Josh Jacobs 1-yard run (Daniel Carlson kick), 5:47. Raiders 7–3. **Drive: 8 plays, 75 yards, 4:15.**
- CAR – Christian McCaffrey 6-yard run (kick failed), 0:59. Panthers 9–7. **Drive: 10 plays, 63 yards, 4:50.**

**Second quarter**

- LV – Daniel Carlson 20-yard field goal, 8:16. Raiders 10–9. **Drive: 15 plays, 73 yards, 7:44.**
- CAR – Joey Slye 46-yard field goal, 5:08. Panthers 12–10. **Drive: 7 plays, 47 yards, 3:10.**
- LV – Nelson Agholor 23-yard pass from Derek Carr (Daniel Carlson kick), 1:54. Raiders 17–12. **Drive: 8 plays, 75 yards, 3:09.**
- CAR – Joey Slye 31-yard field goal, 0:02. Raiders 17–15. **Drive: 11 plays, 62 yards, 1:52.**

**Third quarter**

- LV – Daniel Carlson 54-yard field goal, 9:43. Raiders 20–15. **Drive: 6 plays, 15 yards, 3:04.**
- LV – Josh Jacobs 7-yard run (Daniel Carlson kick), 5:29. Raiders 27–15. **Drive: 6 plays, 49 yards, 3:35.**

**Fourth quarter**

- CAR – Christian McCaffrey 3-yard run (Joey Slye kick), 12:32. Raiders 27–22. **Drive: 5 plays, 11 yards, 3:05.**
- CAR – Robby Anderson 75-yard pass from Teddy Bridgewater (Teddy Bridgewater–Robby Anderson pass), 8:29. Panthers 30–27. **Drive: 2 plays, 77 yards, 0:58.**
- LV – Josh Jacobs 6-yard run (Daniel Carlson kick), 4:08. Raiders 34–30. **Drive: 9 plays, 75 yards, 4:21.**

**Top passers**

- LV – Derek Carr – 22/30, 239 yards, TD
- CAR – Teddy Bridgewater – 22/34, 270 yards, TD

**Top rushers**

- LV – Josh Jacobs – 25 rushes, 93 yards, 3 TD
- CAR – Christian McCaffrey – 23 rushes, 96 yards, 2 TD

**Top receivers**

- LV – Henry Ruggs – 3 receptions, 55 yards
- CAR – Robby Anderson – 6 receptions, 115 yards, TD

In game one as the Las Vegas Raiders, the Raiders traveled across the country to play the Carolina Panthers. The Raiders got the ball first, but could accomplish nothing and quickly fell behind by three as the Panthers converted their opening drive into a 47-yard field goal. In the Raiders second possession of the game, Derek Carr hit rookie wide receiver Henry Ruggs on a 45-yard pass play to set the Raiders up at Carolina's one-yard line. Josh Jacobs scored on the next play to give the Raiders the 7–3 lead. The Panthers quickly answered on a 10-play drive that ended in a touchdown and 10–7 lead for the Panthers. A 15-play, 73-yard Raider drive stalled on the Panther six-yard line as Daniel Carlson tied the game with a 20-yard field goal. Two more Panther field goals sandwiched around another Raider scoring drive, this one an eight-play, 75-yard drive capped off by a Carr pass to newly acquired wide receiver Nelson Agholor as the Raiders went to the half leading 17–15.

In the second half, the Raider defense limited the Panthers to two three-and-outs in their first two possessions as the Raiders pushed the lead to 20–15 on a 54-yard Carlson field goal. Jacobs rushed for his second touchdown of the game with just over five minutes remaining in the third and it looked like the Raiders had put the game away, leading 27–15. However, a 17-play, 75-yard drive for the Panthers ended in a Teddy Bridgewater touchdown pass to Christian McCaffrey. Following a Raiders punt, Bridgewater hit Robby Anderson on a 75-yard touchdown pass to give the Panthers a 30–27 lead with eight minutes remaining in the game. The Raiders answered with a 75-yard drive as Jacobs scored his third touchdown on the day, a six-yard run to give the Raiders a 34–30 lead with four minutes remaining. Needing a touchdown to win, the Panthers moved to midfield, but were stuffed on a fourth and one and the Raiders took over with a chance to run out the game. The Raiders failed to notch a first down to end the game and were forced to punt to the Panthers with eight seconds remaining. The Panthers ran out of time as the Raiders earned their first victory as the Las Vegas Raiders, winning 34–30.

==== Week 2: vs. New Orleans Saints ====
Week Two: New Orleans Saints at Las Vegas Raiders – Game summary

Quarter	1	2	3	4	Total
Saints	10	7	0	7	**24**
**Raiders**	0	17	7	10	**34**

at Allegiant Stadium, Paradise, Nevada

- Date: September 21
- Game time: 5:15 pm. PDT
- Game weather: None (indoor stadium)
- Game attendance: 0
- Referee: Shawn Hochuli
- TV announcers (ESPN/ABC + ESPN2): Steve Levy, Brian Griese, Louis Riddick, Lisa Salters and John Parry; Rece Davis and Kirk Herbstreit (ESPN2 Megacast)
- Recap, Game Book

Game information

**First quarter**

- NO – Wil Lutz 31-yard field goal, 11:01. Saints 3–0. **Drive: 11 plays, 62 yards, 3:59.**
- NO – Alvin Kamara 1-yard run (Wil Lutz kick), 3:51. Saints 10–0. **Drive: 9 plays, 78 yards, 4:07.**

**Second quarter**

- LV – Alec Ingold 3-yard pass from Derek Carr (Daniel Carlson kick), 8:55. Saints 10–7. **Drive: 11 plays, 63 yards, 6:18.**
- NO – Jared Cook 6-yard pass from Drew Brees (Wil Lutz kick), 5:22. Saints 17–7. **Drive: 7 plays, 76 yards, 3:33.**
- LV – Zay Jones 15-yard pass from Derek Carr (Daniel Carlson kick), 1:44. Saints 17–14. **Drive: 10 plays, 75 yards, 3:38.**
- LV – Daniel Carlson 38-yard field goal, 0:09. Tied 17–17. **Drive: 8 plays, 31 yards, 0:39.**

**Third quarter**

- LV – Darren Waller 1-yard pass from Derek Carr (Daniel Carlson kick), 9:58. Raiders 24–17. **Drive: 9 plays, 75 yards, 5:02.**

**Fourth quarter**

- LV – Jalen Richard 20-yard run (Daniel Carlson kick), 7:43. Raiders 31–17. **Drive: 10 plays, 89 yards, 4:34.**
- NO – Alvin Kamara 3-yard run (Wil Lutz kick), 4:33. Raiders 31–24. **Drive: 8 plays, 67 yards, 3:10.**
- LV – Daniel Carlson 54-yard field goal, 1:08. Raiders 34–24. **Drive: 7 plays, 46 yards, 3:26.**

**Top passers**

- NO – Drew Brees – 26/38, 312 yards, TD, INT
- LV – Derek Carr – 28/38, 282 yards, 3 TD

**Top rushers**

- NO – Alvin Kamara – 13 rushes, 79 yards, 2 TD
- LV – Josh Jacobs – 27 rushes, 88 yards

**Top receivers**

- NO – Alvin Kamara – 9 receptions, 95 yards
- LV – Darren Waller – 12 receptions, 103 yards, TD

The Raiders opened Allegiant Stadium on Monday Night Football when the New Orleans Saints visited in Week 2. The Saints took the opening possession 62 yards in 11 plays to score the first points in Allegiant Stadium history as Wil Lutz kicked a field goal from 31 yards out to give the Saints an early 3–0 lead. The Raiders managed a first down on their first possession, but were forced to punt quickly thereafter. The Saints increased their lead by scoring the first touchdown in Allegiant Stadium history as Alvin Kamara scored from one-yard out to push the lead to 10–0. The teams exchanged punts on their next possessions before the Raiders went 63 yards on 11 plays as Derek Carr hit fullback Alec Ingold on a three-yard touchdown pass to draw the score to 10–7 with eight mintutes remaining in the second quarter. The Saints quickly returned the favor, scoring on a Drew Brees pass to Jared Cook to return the lead to 10. A 10-play, 75-yard drive capped off by Zay Jones touchdown catch brought the Raiders within three with less than two minutes remaining in the half. The Saints, looking to extend the lead before half, turned the ball over as Nicholas Morrow intercepted Brees at the Saints' 40. The Raiders moved the ball inside the New Orleans' 10-yard line, but could not go farther, settling for a Daniel Carlson 28-yard field goal to tie the game at 17 at the half.

In the second half, the Raiders took the opening drive 75 yards in nine plays capped off by a Carr pass to Darren Waller to give the Raiders their first lead of the game, 24–17. A defensive stop by the Raiders gave the ball back to the offense, looking to score on their fifth straight possession, but a Carr fumble on the Saints' 40 ended the drive. The Raider defense continued to hold the Saints in check, forcing yet another punt. The Raiders would capitalize, moving 89 yards on 10 plays before Jalen Richard scored on a 20-yard run to give the Raiders a 31–17 lead with just under eight minutes remaining the game. The Saints quickly answered going 67 yards before Kamara scored from three yards out to narrow the lead to seven. With just over four minutes remaining in regulation, the Raiders, helped by a pass interference penalty by Janoris Jenkins, moved into Saints' territory and Carlson hit a 54-yard field goal to put the game out of reach at 34–24. The Saints ran out of time as the Raiders won the inaugural game at Allegiant Stadium and moved their record to 2–0 on the young season.

==== Week 3: at New England Patriots ====
Week Three: Las Vegas Raiders at New England Patriots – Game summary

Quarter	1	2	3	4	Total
Raiders	3	7	0	10	**20**
**Patriots**	0	13	10	13	**36**

at Gillette Stadium, Foxborough, Massachusetts

- Date: September 27
- Game time: 1:00 pm. EDT/10:00 am. PDT
- Game weather: Partly cloudy, 73 °F (23 °C)
- Game attendance: 0
- Referee: Ronald Torbert
- TV announcers (CBS): Jim Nantz, Tony Romo, Tracy Wolfson and Gene Steratore
- Recap, Game Book

Game information

**First quarter**

- LV – Daniel Carlson 29-yard field goal, 0:20. Raiders 3–0. **Drive: 4 plays, 3 yards, 1:35.**

**Second quarter**

- NE – Nick Folk 33-yard field goal, 12:32. Tied 3–3. **Drive: 9 plays, 60 yards, 2:46.**
- NE – Nick Folk 23-yard field goal, 7:56. Patriots 6–3. **Drive: 9 plays, 37 yards, 4:06.**
- NE – Rex Burkhead 11-yard pass from Cam Newton (Nick Folk kick), 0:34. Patriots 13–3. **Drive: 12 plays, 86 yards, 5:04.**
- LV – Foster Moreau 1-yard pass from Derek Carr (Daniel Carlson kick), 0:06. Patriots 13–10. **Drive: 4 plays, 75 yards, 0:28.**

**Third quarter**

- NE – Rex Burkhead 5-yard run (Nick Folk kick), 6:41. Patriots 20–10. **Drive: 7 plays, 69 yards, 4:02.**
- NE – Nick Folk 32-yard field goal, 1:28. Patriots 23–10. **Drive: 7 plays, 61 yards, 3:36.**

**Fourth quarter**

- LV – Daniel Carlson 25-yard field goal, 11:22. Patriots 23–13. **Drive: 11 plays, 68 yards, 5:06.**
- NE – Rex Burkhead 2-yard run (kick failed), 5:17. Patriots 29–13. **Drive: 10 plays, 86 yards, 6:05.**
- NE – Deatrich Wise 0-yard fumble recovery in end zone (Nick Folk kick), 5:09. Patriots 36–13.
- LV – Hunter Renfrow 13-yard pass from Derek Carr (Daniel Carlson kick), 1:54. Patriots 36–20. **Drive: 10 plays, 75 yards, 3:15.**

**Top passers**

- LV – Derek Carr – 24/32, 261 yards, 2 TD
- NE – Cam Newton – 17/28, 162 yards, TD, INT

**Top rushers**

- LV – Josh Jacobs – 16 rushes, 71 yards
- NE – Sony Michel – 9 rushes, 117 yards

**Top receivers**

- LV – Hunter Renfrow – 6 receptions, 84 yards, TD
- NE – Rex Burkhead – 7 receptions, 49 yards, TD

The Raiders returned to the East Coast to face the New England Patriots at Gillette Stadium. Neither offense got off to an early start as the Patriots sandwiched two punts around a Raider punt. On the next Raider drive, the Raiders moved 77 yards before Josh Jacobs fumbled the ball at the New England 13-yard line. The Patriots took over, but quickly turned the ball back over to the Raiders as Johnathan Abram intercepted Cam Newton at the Patriots' 38, returning it to the 14-yard line. The Raiders could manage nothing on the ensuing possession and settled for a 29-yard Daniel Carlson field goal and 3–0 lead. The Patriots tied it on their next drive on a 33-yard Nick Folk field goal. Two plays into the ensuing Raider possession, Carr was stripped of the ball and the Patriots took over at the Raiders' 42-yard line. The Raider defense held the Patriots to a 23-yard field goal as the Patriots took a 6–3 lead. The Raiders were forced to punt again on their next possession and the Patriots took over with about five minutes remaining in the half. An 88-yard drive capped by a Rex Burkhead 11-yard touchdown catch from Newton extended the Patriots lead to 13–3. The Raiders' offense finally got going, moving 75 yards in four plays before Foster Moreau caught a one-yard pass for a touchdown as Vegas narrowed the lead to 13–10. The Patriots ran out the clock and entered half time with the lead.

In the second half, the Raiders moved into Patriot territory, but Carlson missed a 41-yard field goal. New England extended its lead on their next possession, going 69 yards while Burkhead scored from five yards out to push the lead to 20–10. A Raider punt preceded a 32-yard field goal by Folk as the Raiders fell behind 23–10. Vegas moved 68 yards on their next possession, but the drive stalled inside the Patriot 10-yard line. The Raiders settled for another Carlson field goal to draw within 10. However, another Burkhead touchdown run pushed the Patriot lead to 17 with just over five minutes remaining in the game. On the ensuing possession, Carr was sacked and fumbled in the end zone and Deatrich Wise Jr. recovered the fumble to put the game out of reach at 36–13. With just over three minutes remaining, the Raiders were able to drive into Patriot territory and score on a 13-yard touchdown pass to Hunter Renfrow to make the final score 36–20. This would be the Raiders last loss to the Patriots until 2026.

==== Week 4: vs. Buffalo Bills ====
Week Four: Buffalo Bills at Las Vegas Raiders – Game summary

Quarter	1	2	3	4	Total
**Bills**	7	10	0	13	**30**
Raiders	3	10	3	7	**23**

at Allegiant Stadium, Paradise, Nevada

- Date: October 4
- Game time: 1:25 pm. PDT
- Game weather: None (indoor stadium)
- Game attendance: 0
- Referee: Land Clark
- TV announcers (CBS): Spero Dedes and Adam Archuleta
- Recap, Game Book

Game information

**First quarter**

- BUF – Gabe Davis 26-yard pass from Josh Allen (Tyler Bass kick), 10:37. Bills 7–0. **Drive: 8 plays, 75 yards, 4:23.**
- LV – Daniel Carlson 54-yard field goal, 5:07. Bills 7–3. **Drive: 12 plays, 48 yards, 5:30.**

**Second quarter**

- BUF – Cole Beasley 11-yard pass from Josh Allen (Tyler Bass kick), 14:48. Bills 14–3. **Drive: 11 plays, 75 yards, 5:14.**
- LV – Daniel Carlson 39-yard field goal, 9:43. Bills 14–6. **Drive: 12 plays, 54 yards, 5:10.**
- BUF – Tyler Bass 34-yard field goal, 4:13. Bills 17–6. **Drive: 11 plays, 59 yards, 5:25.**
- LV – Jason Witten 3-yard pass from Derek Carr (Daniel Carlson kick), 0:13. Bills 17–13. **Drive: 11 plays, 75 yards, 4:00.**

**Third quarter**

- LV – Daniel Carlson 25-yard field goal, 8:41. Bills 17–16. **Drive: 11 plays, 68 yards, 6:19.**

**Fourth quarter**

- BUF – Josh Allen 1-yard run (kick failed), 14:49. Bills 23–16. **Drive: 6 plays, 45 yards, 2:34.**
- BUF – Devin Singletary 2-yard run (Tyler Bass kick), 11:17. Bills 30–16. **Drive: 4 plays, 60 yards, 1:11.**
- LV – Nelson Agholor 7-yard pass from Derek Carr (Daniel Carlson kick), 1:29. Bills 30–23. **Drive: 8 plays, 80 yards, 2:02.**

**Top passers**

- BUF – Josh Allen – 24/34, 288 yards, 2 TD
- LV – Derek Carr – 32/44, 311 yards, 2 TD

**Top rushers**

- BUF – Devin Singletary – 18 rushes, 55 yards, TD
- LV – Josh Jacobs – 15 rushes, 48 yards

**Top receivers**

- BUF – Stefon Diggs – 6 receptions, 115 yards
- LV – Darren Waller – 9 receptions, 88 yards

Returning home to faced the undefeated Buffalo Bills, the Raiders quickly fell behind as the Bills moved 75 yards on the first possession and took the lead on a Gabe Davis 26-yard touchdown pass from Josh Allen. the Raiders responded with a Daniel Carlson 54-yard field goal to narrow the lead to 7–3. However, Buffalo again moved the down the field on a 75-yard drive capped off by a 11-yard touchdown pass from Allen to Cole Beasley to extend the Bills lead to 14–3. Las Vegas again could only answer with a field goal by Carlson from 39 yards out. The Raider defense was able to prevent the Bills from scoring another touchdown on their next possession, but the Bills did get a 34-yard field goal from Tyler Bass to move the lead to 17–6. The Raider offense, taking over with just over four minutes remaining in the half, moved to the Bills' three-yard line with 13 seconds remaining before Derek Carr hit Jason Witten for his first touchdown as a Raider. The score narrowed the Bills lead to 17–13 at the half.

The Raiders settled for another Carlson field goal to start off the second half, this one from 25 yards out to bring the Raiders within one at 17–16. Both teams then exchanged punts on their next possessions before the Bills took over at the Raider 45 following a 38-yard punt return by Andre Roberts. Allen capped off the short drive with a one-yard run on the first play of the fourth quarter to give the Bills a 23–16 lead after a missed extra point. After moving to the Buffalo 36-yard line, Darren Waller fumbled after making a catch and Bills recovered. Four plays later, Devin Singletary from two yards out to push the lead to 30–16. On the ensuing possession, the Raider went for it from their own 34 on a fourth and one, but were stopped, turning the ball over on downs. The Bills lost yards on the following possession and proceeded to punt. Taking over with 7:20 remaining in the game, the Raiders moved to the Buffalo 33 before Carr was sacked and fumbled the ball and Bills lineman Quinton Jefferson recovered. The Bills were again forced to punt and the Raiders got the ball with 3:30 remaining in the game. Carr hit Nelson Agholor on a seven-yard touchdown pass with 1:20 remaining to bring the Raiders with 30–23. After a failed onside kick, the Bills were able to run out the clock as the defeated the Raiders 30–23. The loss was the second in a row for the Raiders, dropping them to 2–2 on the season.

==== Week 5: at Kansas City Chiefs ====
Week Five: Las Vegas Raiders at Kansas City Chiefs – Game summary

Quarter	1	2	3	4	Total
**Raiders**	3	21	0	16	**40**
Chiefs	7	17	0	8	**32**

at Arrowhead Stadium, Kansas City, Missouri

- Date: October 11
- Game time: 12:00 p.m. CDT/10:00 am. PDT
- Game weather: Sunny, 80 °F (27 °C)
- Game attendance: 13,311
- Referee: Clete Blakeman
- TV announcers (CBS): Ian Eagle, Charles Davis and Evan Washburn
- Recap, Game Book

Game information

**First quarter**

- LV – Daniel Carlson 38-yard field goal, 6:49. Raiders 3–0. **Drive: 11 plays, 75 yards, 5:45.**
- KC – Patrick Mahomes 3-yard run (Harrison Butker kick), 2:06. Chiefs 7–3. **Drive: 9 plays, 88 yards, 4:39.**

**Second quarter**

- KC – Tyreek Hill 10-yard run (Harrison Butker kick), 14:29. Chiefs 14–3. **Drive: 4 plays, 28 yards, 1:05.**
- LV – Nelson Agholor 59-yard pass from Derek Carr (Daniel Carlson kick), 11:48. Chiefs 14–10. **Drive: 5 plays, 75 yards, 2:41.**
- KC – Sammy Watkins 8-yard pass from Patrick Mahomes (Harrison Butker kick), 9:04. Chiefs 21–10. **Drive: 7 plays, 75 yards, 2:44.**
- LV – Darren Waller 5-yard pass from Derek Carr (Daniel Carlson kick), 6:24. Chiefs 21–17. **Drive: 5 plays, 75 yards, 2:40.**
- LV – Henry Ruggs 72-yard pass from Derek Carr (Daniel Carlson kick), 2:39. Raiders 24–21. **Drive: 3 plays, 80 yards, 1:37.**
- KC – Harrison Butker 32-yard field goal, 0:31. Tied 24–24. **Drive: 12 plays, 58 yards, 2:11.**

**Third quarter**

- No scoring plays.

**Fourth quarter**

- LV – Josh Jacobs 7-yard run (kick failed), 14:14. Raiders 30–24. **Drive: 13 plays, 71 yards, 8:00.**
- LV – Daniel Carlson 43-yard field goal, 6:39. Raiders 33–24. **Drive: 10 plays, 45 yards, 5:11.**
- LV – Josh Jacobs 2-yard run (Daniel Carlson kick), 5:26. Raiders 40–24. **Drive: 1 play, 2 yards, 0:05.**
- KC – Travis Kelce 7-yard pass from Patrick Mahomes (Patrick Mahomes–Darrel Williams pass), 3:57. Raiders 40–32. **Drive: 8 plays, 75 yards, 1:29.**

**Top passers**

- LV – Derek Carr – 22/31, 347 yards, 3 TD, INT
- KC – Patrick Mahomes – 22/43, 340 yards, 2 TD, INT

**Top rushers**

- LV – Josh Jacobs – 23 rushes, 77 yards, 2 TD
- KC – Clyde Edwards-Helaire – 10 rushes, 40 yards

**Top receivers**

- LV – Henry Ruggs – 2 receptions, 118 yards, TD
- KC – Travis Kelce – 8 receptions, 108 yards, TD

Traveling to Kansas City to face the undefeated Chiefs, the Raider defense started well, forcing the Chiefs to punt. Led by Josh Jacobs, the Raiders drove to the Chief 20-yard line before settling for a 38-yard field by Daniel Carlson to take an early 3–0 lead. The Chiefs quickly responded, going 88 yards in just over four minutes as Patrick Mahomes scored from three yards out to give KC the 7–3 lead. On the ensuing possession, Derek Carr threw his first interception of the season, setting the Chiefs up at the Raider 28-yard line. Tyreek Hill scored on a 10-yard run to push the lead to 14–3 as the Raiders appeared to be on the verge of being routed. However, the Raiders answered on a five-play scoring drive as Carr his Nelson Agholor on a 59-yard touchdown pass to draw the Raiders within four. The Chiefs again extended the lead, scoring on an eight-yard pass from Mahomes to Sammy Watkins, moving the Chiefs back ahead by 11, 21–10. With just over nine minutes remaining in the second quarter, the Raider offense refused to give up, moving 75 yards on five plays before Carr hit Darren Waller on a five-yard touchdown pass which again narrowed the Chief lead to four. The Raider defense forced the Chiefs to punt on the next possession for the second time in the game, giving the Raiders the ball at their own 20 with 4:16 remaining in the half. Carr then hit Henry Ruggs on a 72-yard touchdown pass to give the Raiders the lead at 24–21. The Chiefs tied it with a Harrison Butker 32-yard field goal with 28 seconds left in the half which left the game tied at 24 at the half.

After the offensive outburst in the first half, each team punted on their first two possessions in the third quarter and no points were scored in the quarter. The Raiders took over with 7:14 left in the quarter and engineered a 13-play, eight-minute drive that ended with Jacobs scoring from seven yards out with 14:14 remaining in the game. The score gave the Raiders the 30–24 lead as Carlson's extra point was no good. The Chiefs again were forced to punt and the Raiders extended the lead to 33–24 on a Carlson 43-yard field goal with 6:34 remaining. The Chiefs, trailing with time ticking down went for it on fourth down at their own 28. However, Mahomes' pass was intercepted by Raider safety Jeff Heath and he returned the ball to the Chief two-yard line. Jacobs punched the ball in on the next play and the Raiders moved the lead to 16 with 5:36 remaining. The Chief offense finally got going, moving 75 yards on eight plays before Mahomes hit Travis Kelce on a seven-yard touchdown pass. The two-point conversion was successful and the Chiefs moved within eight at 40–32. With 3:57 remaining, the Raiders notched one first down and moved to the KC 45-yard line at the two-minute warning. Faced with a fourth-and-one, John Gruden elected to go for it and Carr took the quarterback sneak up the middle for the first down and assured the win. The Raiders were then able to kneel out the clock and hold on to the 40–32 win. The win moved the Raiders to 3–2 on the season as their bye week lay ahead.

==== Week 7: vs. Tampa Bay Buccaneers ====
Week Seven: Tampa Bay Buccaneers at Las Vegas Raiders – Game summary

Quarter	1	2	3	4	Total
**Buccaneers**	7	14	3	21	**45**
Raiders	7	3	7	3	**20**

at Allegiant Stadium, Paradise, Nevada

- Date: October 25
- Game time: 1:05 pm. PDT
- Game weather: None (indoor stadium)
- Game attendance: 0
- Referee: Scott Novak
- TV announcers (Fox): Adam Amin, Mark Schlereth and Lindsay Czarniak
- Recap, Game Book

Game information

**First quarter**

- LV – Nelson Agholor 21-yard pass from Derek Carr (Daniel Carlson kick), 9:55. Raiders 7–0. **Drive: 6 plays, 70 yards, 3:37.**
- TB – Tom Brady 1-yard run (Ryan Succop kick), 5:37. Tied 7–7. **Drive: 10 plays, 77 yards, 4:18.**

**Second quarter**

- LV – Daniel Carlson 42-yard field goal, 14:56. Raiders 10–7. **Drive: 11 plays, 51 yards, 5:46.**
- TB – Rob Gronkowski 5-yard pass from Tom Brady (Ryan Succop kick), 4:21. Buccaneers 14–10. **Drive: 8 plays, 85 yards, 4:32.**
- TB – Scotty Miller 33-yard pass from Tom Brady (Ryan Succop kick), 0:17. Buccaneers 21–10. **Drive: 13 plays, 88 yards, 2:02.**

**Third quarter**

- TB – Ryan Succop 39-yard field goal, 8:16. Buccaneers 24–10. **Drive: 10 plays, 69 yards, 4:45.**
- LV – Darren Waller 1-yard pass from Derek Carr (Daniel Carlson kick), 4:15. Buccaneers 24–17. **Drive: 6 plays, 71 yards, 4:01.**

**Fourth quarter**

- LV – Daniel Carlson 36-yard field goal, 12:43. Buccaneers 24–20. **Drive: 11 plays, 54 yards, 4:40.**
- TB – Chris Godwin 4-yard pass from Tom Brady (Ryan Succop kick), 7:22. Buccaneers 31–20. **Drive: 11 plays, 67 yards, 5:21.**
- TB – Ronald Jones 1-yard run (Ryan Succop kick), 6:40. Buccaneers 38–20. **Drive: 2 plays, 24 yards, 0:29.**
- TB – Tyler Johnson 1-yard pass from Tom Brady (Ryan Succop kick), 3:08. Buccaneers 45–20. **Drive: 6 plays, 32 yards, 2:19.**

**Top passers**

- TB – Tom Brady – 33/45, 369 yards, 4 TD
- LV – Derek Carr – 24/36, 284 yards, 2 TD, INT

**Top rushers**

- TB – Leonard Fournette – 11 rushes, 50 yards
- LV – Jalen Richard – 7 rushes, 24 yards

**Top receivers**

- TB – Scotty Miller – 6 receptions, 109 yards, TD
- LV – Nelson Agholor – 5 receptions, 107 yards, TD

The Raiders were scheduled to play the Tampa Bay Buccaneers on Sunday Night Football at Allegiant Stadium. However, after Raiders offensive tackle Trent Brown tested positive for COVID-19, the game was moved to earlier in the day and to ensure, if the game had to be rescheduled, that a game would be played on Sunday Night Football. Shortly thereafter, the Raiders placed five more players on the COVID-19 list including the entire starting offensive line and safety Johnathan Abram. On October 24, left tackle Kolton Miller, center Rodney Hudson, and guards Gabe Jackson and Denzelle Good were available and played in the game.

John Gruden faced his former team whom he led to a Super Bowl XXXVII win over the Raiders in 2003. The Raiders jumped to an early lead after the Bucs were forced to punt on their first possession. A six-play, 70-yard drive was capped off by a Nelson Agholor touchdown reception from Derek Carr. Tampa Bay answered on the ensuing possession as Tom Brady scored from one yard out to even the score at seven. A Raider field goal gave the Raiders a 10–7 lead early in the second quarter. After each team traded punts, the Buccaneers took the lead on five-yard touchdown pass from Brady to Rob Gronkowski moving the score to 14–7. A Raider punt preceded another Tampa touchdown, this one a 33-yard pass from Brady to Scotty Miller as Tamp took a 21–10 lead at the half.

In the second half, Vegas was forced to punt again while Tampa extended the lead to 24–10 on a Ryan Succop 47-yard field goal. Trailing by 14, the Raiders cut the lead in half on their next possession as Darren Waller scored on a one-yard pass from Carr. Vegas moved even closer on their next possession as Daniel Carlson hit a 36-yard field goal to narrow the lead to 24–20. However, Brady's third touchdown pass on the day preceded a Carr interception setting up Tampa inside the Raider 25-yard line. Ronald Jones II rushed for a touchdown as the lead ballooned to 38–20. After Vegas turned the ball over on downs, the Bucs scored again, on Brady's fourth touchdown pass to finish the game 45–20.

The loss moved the Raiders to 3–3 on the season.

==== Week 8: at Cleveland Browns ====
Week Eight: Las Vegas Raiders at Cleveland Browns – Game summary

Quarter	1	2	3	4	Total
**Raiders**	0	6	0	10	**16**
Browns	0	3	3	0	**6**

at FirstEnergy Stadium, Cleveland, Ohio

- Date: November 1
- Game time: 1:00 pm. EST/10:00 am. PST
- Game weather: Cloudy, 49 °F (9 °C)
- Game attendance: 10,972
- Referee: Bill Vinovich
- TV announcers (Fox): Kevin Kugler, Chris Spielman and Laura Okmin
- Recap, Game Book

Game information

**First quarter**

- No scoring plays.

**Second quarter**

- CLE – Cody Parkey 41-yard field goal, 13:39. Browns 3–0. **Drive: 14 plays, 60 yards, 7:52.**
- LV – Daniel Carlson 29-yard field goal, 5:21. Tied 3–3. **Drive: 16 plays, 58 yards, 8:14.**
- LV – Daniel Carlson 33-yard field goal, 0:02. Raiders 6–3. **Drive: 11 plays, 51 yards, 3:59.**

**Third quarter**

- CLE – Cody Parkey 38-yard field goal, 8:50. Tied 6–6. **Drive: 11 plays, 55 yards, 6:10.**

**Fourth quarter**

- LV – Hunter Renfrow 4-yard pass from Derek Carr (Daniel Carlson kick), 14:56. Raiders 13–6. **Drive: 15 plays, 75 yards, 8:54.**
- LV – Daniel Carlson 24-yard field goal, 4:26. Raiders 16–6. **Drive: 13 plays, 74 yards, 8:45.**

**Top passers**

- LV – Derek Carr – 15/24, 112 yards, TD
- CLE – Baker Mayfield – 12/25, 122 yards

**Top rushers**

- LV – Josh Jacobs – 31 rushes, 128 yards
- CLE – Kareem Hunt – 14 rushes, 66 yards

**Top receivers**

- LV – Darren Waller – 5 receptions, 28 yards
- CLE – Jarvis Landry – 4 receptions, 52 yards

Prior to the game, offensive lineman Trent Brown was rushed to the hospital after a botched IV attempt let air enter his bloodstream. Brown was released from the hospital two days later. A few days later, Brown was placed back on the COVID-19/reserve list and was expected to miss several weeks.

The Raiders traveled to play the Browns in Cleveland in poor weather conditions including high winds. As a result, both offenses struggled in the game as the Raiders missed an early field goal attempt on their first possession. A Browns' fumble on the ensuing possession led to nothing as the Raiders were forced to punt. The Brown managed a 14-play, 60-yard drive on their next possession before Cody Parkey hit a 41-yard field goal early in the second quarter. The Raiders answered on the ensuing possession, moving 58 yards on 16 plays before Daniel Carlson connected on a 29-yard field goal to tie the game at three. Following a three-and-out for the Browns, the Raiders took the lead on a Carlson 33-yard field goal as the half expired.

The Brown quickly tied the game at six on the first possession of the second half. However, the Raiders responded with a 15-play, 75-yard drive capped off a Hunter Renfrow four-yard touchdown catch from Derek Carr to give Vegas the 13– lead. A missed field goal by the Browns set the Raiders up for another long drive, this one 13 play and covering 74 yards while using up almost nine minutes of game time. Josh Jacobs was stuffed at the goal line on three straight running plays as the Raiders settled for the field goal and the 16–6 lead with 4:24 remaining in the game. The Browns were able to move the ball 56 yards on their next possession, but a missed field goal turned the ball over to the Raiders who were able to run out the clock for the 16–6 win.

The win moved the Raiders to 4–3 on the season.

==== Week 9: at Los Angeles Chargers ====
Week Nine: Las Vegas Raiders at Los Angeles Chargers – Game summary

Quarter	1	2	3	4	Total
**Raiders**	7	7	14	3	**31**
Chargers	0	17	3	6	**26**

at SoFi Stadium, Inglewood, California

- Date: November 8
- Game time: 1:05 pm. PST
- Game weather: Mostly cloudy, 60 °F (16 °C)
- Game attendance: 0
- Referee: Brad Rogers
- TV announcers (Fox): Joe Davis, Mark Schlereth and Lindsay Czarniak
- Recap, Game Book

Game information

**First quarter**

- LV – Devontae Booker 23-yard run (Daniel Carlson kick), 4:48. Raiders 7–0. **Drive: 7 plays, 62 yards, 3:33.**

**Second quarter**

- LAC – Kalen Ballage 5-yard run (Michael Badgley kick), 13:24. Tied 7–7. **Drive: 13 plays, 61 yards, 6:18.**
- LV – Josh Jacobs 14-yard run (Daniel Carlson kick), 5:41. Raiders 14–7. **Drive: 6 plays, 44 yards, 3:23.**
- LAC – Keenan Allen 27-yard pass from Justin Herbert (Michael Badgley kick), 0:26. Tied 14–14. **Drive: 10 plays, 75 yards, 5:15.**
- LAC – Michael Badgley 45-yard field goal, 0:08. Chargers 17–14. **Drive: 1 play, 0 yards, 0:03.**

**Third quarter**

- LV – Nelson Agholor 45-yard pass from Derek Carr (Daniel Carlson kick), 13:18. Raiders 21–17. **Drive: 4 plays, 55 yards, 1:42.**
- LV – Darren Waller 3-yard pass from Derek Carr (Daniel Carlson kick), 7:49. Raiders 28–17. **Drive: 8 plays, 75 yards, 3:39.**
- LAC – Michael Badgley 29-yard field goal, 4:23. Raiders 28–20. **Drive: 9 plays, 62 yards, 3:30.**

**Fourth quarter**

- LAC – Gabe Nabers 4-yard pass from Justin Herbert (run failed), 9:04. Raiders 28–26. **Drive: 12 plays, 82 yards, 5:47.**
- LV – Daniel Carlson 31-yard field goal, 4:41. Raiders 31–26. **Drive: 6 plays, 18 yards, 3:30.**

**Top passers**

- LV – Derek Carr – 13/23, 165 yards, 2 TD
- LAC – Justin Herbert – 28/42, 326 yards, 2 TD

**Top rushers**

- LV – Devontae Booker – 8 rushes, 68 yards, TD
- LAC – Kalen Ballage – 15 rushes, 69 yards, TD

**Top receivers**

- LV – Hunter Renfrow – 2 receptions, 60 yards
- LAC – Keenan Allen – 9 receptions, 103 yards, TD

Vegas traveled to their former home Los Angeles to play the Chargers at SoFi Stadium. After trading punts on their first possessions, the Chargers missed a field goal setting the Raiders up at their 38-yard line. Seven plays later, Devontae Booker scored for the Raiders on a 23-yard run to give Vegas a 7–0 lead. The Chargers answered on a 13-play drive capped off by a give yard run by Kalen Ballage to tie the game at seven. The teams again exchanged punts before the Raiders took the lead on a 14-yard touchdown run by Josh Jacobs. The Charges answered again, tying the game at 14 on a Keenan Allen 27-yard pass from Justin Herbert. Derek Carr was sacked and fumbled the ball on the Raiders next possession with less than 10 seconds remaining which set the Chargers up for a 45-yard field goal and a 17–14 lead at the half.

Vegas scored touchdown on their first two possessions of the second half as Nelson Agholor caught a 45-yard pass from Carr and Darren Waller scored on a two-yard pass from Waller to give the Raiders a 28–17 lead. A field goal by the Chargers narrowed the lead to eight. Following a Vegas punt, Herbert hit Gabe Nabers on a four-yard touchdown pass. The two-point conversion failed, leaving the Raiders with a 28–26 lead with nine minutes remaining in the game. The Raiders were again forced to punt, but Charger return man K. J. Hill fumbled the punt, giving the Raiders the ball at the Chargers 31. The Raiders drive stalled at the Chargers 13 and the Raiders settled for a 31-yard field goal and a 31–26 lead. With 4:37 remaining in the game, the Chargers moved into Raider territory attempting to win the game in the final seconds. Getting to the one-yard line with one second left, Herbert hit Donald Parham in the corner of the end zone as time expired for an apparent game-winning touchdown. However, upon review, the ball clearly hit the ground as Parham fell and the call was overturned resulting in an incomplete pass and a Raider victory.

The win marked the Raiders second straight as they moved to 5–3 on the season.

==== Week 10: vs. Denver Broncos ====
Week Ten: Denver Broncos at Las Vegas Raiders – Game summary

Quarter	1	2	3	4	Total
Broncos	3	3	0	6	**12**
**Raiders**	7	3	10	17	**37**

at Allegiant Stadium, Paradise, Nevada

- Date: November 15
- Game time: 1:05 pm. PST
- Game weather: None (indoor stadium)
- Game attendance: 0
- Referee: Tony Corrente
- TV announcers (CBS): Kevin Harlan, Trent Green and Melanie Collins
- Recap, Game Book

Game information

**First quarter**

- LV – Josh Jacobs 11-yard run (Daniel Carlson kick), 9:44. Raiders 7–0. **Drive: 7 plays, 62 yards, 3:42.**
- DEN – Brandon McManus 50-yard field goal, 7:17. Raiders 7–3. **Drive: 8 plays, 42 yards, 2:33.**

**Second quarter**

- DEN – Brandon McManus 33-yard field goal, 8:19. Raiders 7–6. **Drive: 8 plays, 56 yards, 3:07.**
- LV – Daniel Carlson 24-yard field goal, 1:48. Raiders 10–6. **Drive: 13 plays, 81 yards, 6:31.**

**Third quarter**

- LV – Daniel Carlson 52-yard field goal, 9:20. Raiders 13–6. **Drive: 12 plays, 47 yards, 5:47.**
- LV – Josh Jacobs 5-yard run (Daniel Carlson kick), 0:36. Raiders 20–6. **Drive: 11 plays, 78 yards, 7:41.**

**Fourth quarter**

- LV – Daniel Carlson 22-yard field goal, 13:26. Raiders 23–6. **Drive: 4 plays, 7 yards, 1:26.**
- LV – Devontae Booker 7-yard run (Daniel Carlson kick), 10:00. Raiders 30–6. **Drive: 1 plays, 7 yards, 0:05.**
- DEN – DaeSean Hamilton 7-yard pass from Drew Lock (pass failed), 6:10. Raiders 30–12. **Drive: 12 plays, 75 yards, 3:50.**
- LV – Devontae Booker 23-yard run (Daniel Carlson kick), 5:59. Raiders 37–12. **Drive: 7 plays, 48 yards, 4:16.**

**Top passers**

- DEN – Drew Lock – 23/47, 257 yards, TD, 4 INT
- LV – Derek Carr – 16/25, 154 yards

**Top rushers**

- DEN – Melvin Gordon – 11 rushes, 46 yards
- LV – Josh Jacobs – 21 rushes, 112 yards, 2 TD

**Top receivers**

- DEN – Jerry Jeudy – 4 receptions, 68 yards
- LV – Darren Waller – 3 receptions, 37 yards

The Raiders played a complete game and dominated on both sides of the ball. The defense, which had not intercepted a pass in its last three games, intercepted Broncos QB Drew Lock four times. The Raiders scored four rushing touchdowns in the game, their most of the season.

==== Week 11: vs. Kansas City Chiefs ====
Week Eleven: Kansas City Chiefs at Las Vegas Raiders – Game summary

Quarter	1	2	3	4	Total
**Chiefs**	7	7	7	14	**35**
Raiders	14	3	0	14	**31**

at Allegiant Stadium, Paradise, Nevada

- Date: November 22
- Game time: 5:20 pm. PST
- Game weather: None (indoor stadium)
- Game attendance: 0
- Referee: Carl Cheffers
- TV announcers (NBC): Al Michaels, Cris Collinsworth and Michele Tafoya
- Recap, Game Book

Game information

**First quarter**

- LV – Josh Jacobs 2-yard run (Daniel Carlson kick), 11:25. Raiders 7–0. **Drive: 6 plays, 75 yards, 3:35.**
- KC – Tyreek Hill 3-yard pass from Patrick Mahomes (Harrison Butker kick), 4:06. Tied 7–7. **Drive: 14 plays, 85 yards, 7:24.**
- LV – Nelson Agholor 17-yard pass from Derek Carr (Daniel Carlson kick), 0:00. Raiders 14–7. **Drive: 7 plays, 60 yards, 4:01.**

**Second quarter**

- KC – Clyde Edwards-Helaire 3-yard run (Harrison Butker kick), 11:16. Tied 14–14. **Drive: 7 plays, 73 yards, 3:44.**
- LV – Daniel Carlson 35-yard field goal, 4:36. Raiders 17–14. **Drive: 12 plays, 59 yards, 6:40.**

**Third quarter**

- KC – Clyde Edwards-Helaire 14-yard run (Harrison Butker kick), 6:23. Chiefs 21–17. **Drive: 16 plays, 93 yards, 8:37.**

**Fourth quarter**

- LV – Darren Waller 3-yard pass from Derek Carr (Daniel Carlson kick), 14:54. Raiders 24–21. **Drive: 11 plays, 75 yards, 6:29.**
- KC – Le'Veon Bell 6-yard run (Harrison Butker kick), 5:54. Chiefs 28–24. **Drive: 12 plays, 91 yards, 5:39.**
- LV – Jason Witten 1-yard pass from Derek Carr (Daniel Carlson kick), 1:43. Raiders 31–28. **Drive: 12 plays, 75 yards, 4:11.**
- KC – Travis Kelce 35-yard pass from Patrick Mahomes (Harrison Butker kick), 0:28. Chiefs 35–31. **Drive: 7 plays, 75 yards, 1:15.**

**Top passers**

- KC – Patrick Mahomes – 34/45, 348 yards, 2 TD, INT
- LV – Derek Carr – 23/31, 275 yards, 3 TD, INT

**Top rushers**

- KC – Clyde Edwards-Helaire – 14 rushes, 69 yards, 2 TD
- LV – Josh Jacobs – 17 rushes, 55 yards, TD

**Top receivers**

- KC – Travis Kelce – 8 receptions, 127 yards, TD
- LV – Darren Waller – 7 receptions, 88 yards, TD

With the loss, the Raiders failed to sweep the Chiefs which they have not done since 2012.

On November 17, the Raiders placed two players on the COVID-19/reserve list. Defensive end Clelin Ferrell and cornerback Lamarcus Joyner joined linebacker Cory Littleton what was placed on the list November 12. On November 18, the Raiders placed seven additional defensive players on the list: safety Johnathan Abram, defensive tackles Maliek Collins, Johnathan Hankins, and Kendal Vickers, defensive end Arden Key, cornerback Isaiah Johnson, and practice-squad defensive end David Irving were determined to have had close contact with Ferrell. It was later revealed that Ferrell and Joyner were the only ones who had tested positive. It is possible the players beside Ferrell and Joyner could play in the game against the Chiefs if they have positive tests before the game.

==== Week 12: at Atlanta Falcons ====
Week Twelve: Las Vegas Raiders at Atlanta Falcons – Game summary

Quarter	1	2	3	4	Total
Raiders	0	3	3	0	**6**
**Falcons**	6	10	14	13	**43**

at Mercedes-Benz Stadium, Atlanta, Georgia

- Date: November 29
- Game time: 1:00 pm. EST/10:00 am. PST
- Game weather: None (retractable roof closed)
- Game attendance: 9,124
- Referee: Land Clark
- TV announcers (CBS): Kevin Harlan, Trent Green and Amanda Balionis
- Recap, Game Book

Game information

**First quarter**

- ATL – Younghoe Koo 38-yard field goal, 8:26. Falcons 3–0. **Drive: 7 plays, 25 yards, 3:01.**
- ATL – Younghoe Koo 39-yard field goal, 7:06. Falcons 6–0. **Drive: 4 plays, 0 yards, 1:08.**

**Second quarter**

- LV – Daniel Carlson 29-yard field goal, 12:59. Falcons 6–3. **Drive: 9 plays, 51 yards, 4:25.**
- ATL – Calvin Ridley 4-yard pass from Matt Ryan (Younghoe Koo kick), 2:17. Falcons 13–3. **Drive: 13 plays, 82 yards, 7:21.**
- ATL – Younghoe Koo 30-yard field goal, 0:02. Falcons 16–3. **Drive: 8 plays, 49 yards, 0:59.**

**Third quarter**

- ATL – Deion Jones 67-yard interception return (Younghoe Koo kick), 11:36. Falcons 23–3.
- LV – Daniel Carlson 24-yard field goal, 6:39. Falcons 23–6. **Drive: 12 plays, 69 yards, 4:57.**
- ATL – Brandon Powell 4-yard pass from Matt Ryan (Younghoe Koo kick), 2:01. Falcons 30–6. **Drive: 11 plays, 88 yards, 4:39.**

**Fourth quarter**

- ATL – Younghoe Koo 29-yard field goal, 13:34. Falcons 33–6. **Drive: 6 plays, 16 yards, 3:07.**
- ATL – Ito Smith 8-yard run (Younghoe Koo kick), 10:48. Falcons 40–6. **Drive: 4 plays, 35 yards, 1:25.**
- ATL – Younghoe Koo 54-yard field goal, 4:57. Falcons 43–6. **Drive: 7 plays, 33 yards, 4:27.**

**Top passers**

- LV – Derek Carr – 22/34, 215 yards, INT
- ATL – Matt Ryan – 22/39, 185 yards, 2 TD, INT

**Top rushers**

- LV – Josh Jacobs – 7 rushes, 27 yards
- ATL – Ito Smith – 12 rushes, 65 yards, TD

**Top receivers**

- LV – Hunter Renfrow – 7 receptions, 73 yards
- ATL – Calvin Ridley – 6 receptions, 50 yards, TD

The Raiders suffered from an offensive meltdown against the Falcons as Carr threw a pick-six and lost 3 fumbles on the day and Jacobs also lost a fumble. The blowout loss dropped the Raiders to 6–5 on the season. They once again failed to beat the Falcons, not having done so since 2000.

==== Week 13: at New York Jets ====
Week Thirteen: Las Vegas Raiders at New York Jets – Game summary

Quarter	1	2	3	4	Total
**Raiders**	7	10	7	7	**31**
Jets	7	6	0	15	**28**

at MetLife Stadium, East Rutherford, New Jersey

- Date: December 6
- Game time: 1:00 pm. EST/10:00 am. PST
- Game weather: Sunny and cold, 39 °F (4 °C)
- Game attendance: 0
- Referee: Shawn Smith
- TV announcers (CBS): Spero Dedes and Adam Archuleta
- Recap, Game Book

Game information

**First quarter**

- NYJ – Jamison Crowder 3-yard pass from Sam Darnold (Sergio Castillo kick), 9:03. Jets 7–0. **Drive: 12 plays, 74 yards, 5:57.**
- LV – Darren Waller 9-yard pass from Derek Carr (Daniel Carlson kick), 0:12. Tied 7–7. **Drive: 7 plays, 79 yards, 3:59.**

**Second quarter**

- NYJ – Jamison Crowder 6-yard pass from Sam Darnold (kick failed), 12:02. Jets 13–7. **Drive: 7 plays, 69 yards, 3:10.**
- LV – Daniel Carlson 48-yard field goal, 6:07. Jets 13–10. **Drive: 4 plays, 1 yard, 0:51.**
- LV – Darren Waller 38-yard pass from Derek Carr (Daniel Carlson kick), 1:12. Raiders 17–13. **Drive: 5 plays, 66 yards, 1:54.**

**Third quarter**

- LV – Derek Carr 2-yard run (Daniel Carlson kick), 7:52. Raiders 24–13. **Drive: 7 plays, 79 yards, 3:59.**

**Fourth quarter**

- NYJ – Sam Darnold 4-yard run (Sam Darnold–Denzel Mims pass), 10:22. Raiders 24–21. **Drive: 9 plays, 96 yards, 5:00.**
- NYJ – Ty Johnson 1-yard run (Sergio Castillo kick), 5:34. Jets 28–24. **Drive: 6 plays, 44 yards, 3:11.**
- LV – Henry Ruggs 46-yard pass from Derek Carr (Daniel Carlson kick), 0:05. Raiders 31–28. **Drive: 4 plays, 61 yards, 0:30.**

**Top passers**

- LV – Derek Carr – 28/47, 381 yards, 3 TD, INT
- NYJ – Sam Darnold – 14/23, 186 yards, 2 TD, INT

**Top rushers**

- LV – Devontae Booker – 16 rushes, 50 yards
- NYJ – Ty Johnson – 22 rushes, 104 yards, TD

**Top receivers**

- LV – Darren Waller – 13 receptions, 200 yards, 2 TD
- NYJ – Jamison Crowder – 5 receptions, 47 yards, 2 TD

After suffering a disappointing loss, the Raiders then went to MetLife Stadium to face the winless Jets. The Jets took an early lead, before the Raiders tied with 12 seconds in the first quarter. The Jets scored again, but the PAT failed. The Raiders took a 17–10 halftime lead after scoring 10 points. The Raiders would take the lone TD in the third and lead 24–13. The Jets began to rally in the fourth, and managed to retake the lead with 5:34 remaining. After back and forth possessions, when it seemed like all hope was lost, Henry Ruggs scored the game-winning touchdown with five seconds left to give the Raiders the 31–28 win. Jets defensive coordinator Gregg Williams was fired after the game amid scrutiny for the "cover zero" play call on the Raiders' final touchdownthat allowed Ruggs to beat Jets rookie corner Lamar Jackson one-on-one for the easy touchdown. With the win, the Raiders improved to 7–5 and snapped a 2-game losing streak.

==== Week 14: vs. Indianapolis Colts ====
Week Fourteen: Indianapolis Colts at Las Vegas Raiders – Game summary

Quarter	1	2	3	4	Total
**Colts**	10	10	7	17	**44**
Raiders	7	7	6	7	**27**

at Allegiant Stadium, Paradise, Nevada

- Date: December 13
- Game time: 1:05 pm. PST
- Game weather: None (indoor stadium)
- Game attendance: 0
- Referee: Clete Blakeman
- TV announcers (CBS): Ian Eagle, Charles Davis and Evan Washburn
- Recap, Game Book

Game information

**First quarter**

- IND – Rodrigo Blankenship 25-yard field goal, 8:56. Colts 3–0. **Drive: 10 plays, 68 yards, 6:08.**
- IND – T. Y. Hilton 7-yard pass from Philip Rivers (Rodrigo Blankenship kick), 2:59. Colts 10–0. **Drive: 11 plays, 72 yards, 4:50.**
- LV – Foster Moreau 47-yard pass from Derek Carr (Daniel Carlson kick), 0:09. Colts 10–7. **Drive: 5 plays, 76 yards, 2:50.**

**Second quarter**

- LV – Nelson Agholor 21-yard pass from Derek Carr (Daniel Carlson kick), 10:39. Raiders 14–10. **Drive: 8 plays, 83 yards, 3:23.**
- IND – T. Y. Hilton 44-yard pass from Philip Rivers (Rodrigo Blankenship kick), 9:03. Colts 17–14. **Drive: 3 plays, 68 yards, 1:35.**
- IND – Rodrigo Blankenship 20-yard field goal, 0:00. Colts 20–14. **Drive: 13 plays, 78 yards, 3:30.**

**Third quarter**

- LV – Daniel Carlson 25-yard field goal, 9:45. Colts 20–17. **Drive: 13 plays, 68 yards, 5:19.**
- IND – Jonathan Taylor 67-yard run (Rodrigo Blankenship kick), 7:27. Colts 27–17. **Drive: 5 plays, 75 yards, 2:14.**
- LV – Daniel Carlson 23-yard field goal, 0:17. Colts 27–20. **Drive: 14 plays, 70 yards, 7:14.**

**Fourth quarter**

- IND – Jonathan Taylor 3-yard run (Rodrigo Blankenship kick), 9:40. Colts 34–20. **Drive: 19 plays, 75 yards, 5:50.**
- IND – Rodrigo Blankenship 35-yard field goal, 6:55. Colts 37–20. **Drive: 4 plays, 9 yards, 2:25.**
- IND – Khari Willis 50-yard interception return (Rodrigo Blankenship kick), 5:32. Colts 44–20.
- LV – Derek Carr 5-yard run (Daniel Carlson kick), 0:55. Colts 44–27. **Drive: 13 plays, 75 yards, 4:27.**

**Top passers**

- IND – Philip Rivers – 19/28, 244 yards, 2 TD
- LV – Derek Carr – 31/45, 316 yards, 2 TD, 2 INT

**Top rushers**

- IND – Jonathan Taylor – 20 rushes, 150 yards, 2 TD
- LV – Josh Jacobs – 13 rushes, 49 yards

**Top receivers**

- IND – T. Y. Hilton – 5 receptions, 86 yards, 2 TD
- LV – Nelson Agholor – 5 receptions, 100 yards, TD

The loss had deeper repercussions as defensive coordinator Paul Guenther was fired following a poor performance which saw the Colts roll up 456 yards and 44 points.

==== Week 15: vs. Los Angeles Chargers ====
Week Fifteen: Los Angeles Chargers at Las Vegas Raiders – Game summary

Quarter	1	2	3	4	OT	Total
**Chargers**	7	10	7	0	6	**30**
Raiders	3	7	7	7	3	**27**

at Allegiant Stadium, Paradise, Nevada

- Date: December 17
- Game time: 5:20 pm. PST
- Game weather: None (indoor stadium)
- Game attendance: 0
- Referee: John Hussey
- TV announcers (Fox/NFLN/Amazon Prime Video): Joe Buck, Troy Aikman, Erin Andrews and Kristina Pink
- Preview, Game Book

Game information

**First quarter**

- LAC – Hunter Henry 10-yard pass from Justin Herbert (Michael Badgley kick), 5:56. Chargers 7–0. **Drive: 12 plays, 78 yards, 7:29.**
- LV – Daniel Carlson 23-yard field goal, 0:55. Chargers 7–3. **Drive: 9 plays, 70 yards, 5:01.**

**Second quarter**

- LV – Darren Waller 35-yard pass from Marcus Mariota (Daniel Carlson kick), 9:19. Raiders 10–7. **Drive: 7 plays, 86 yards, 4:10.**
- LAC – Michael Badgley 22-yard field goal, 1:56. Tied 10–10. **Drive: 14 plays, 71 yards, 7:27.**
- LAC – Tyron Johnson 26-yard pass from Justin Herbert (Michael Badgley kick), 0:19. Chargers 17–10. **Drive: 4 plays, 49 yards, 0:41.**

**Third quarter**

- LV – Josh Jacobs 1-yard run (Daniel Carlson kick), 7:18. Tied 17–17. **Drive: 10 plays, 76 yards, 5:23.**
- LAC – Kalen Ballage 1-yard run (Michael Badgley kick), 2:08. Chargers 24–17. **Drive: 12 plays, 75 yards, 5:10.**

**Fourth quarter**

- LV – Marcus Mariota 2-yard run (Daniel Carlson kick), 6:16. Tied 24–24. **Drive: 19 plays, 75 yards, 10:52.**

**Overtime**

- LV – Daniel Carlson 23-yard field goal, 3:22. Raiders 27–24. **Drive: 14 plays, 70 yards, 6:42.**
- LAC – Justin Herbert 1-yard run, 1:32. Chargers 30–27. **Drive: 5 plays, 75 yards, 1:49.**

**Top passers**

- LAC – Justin Herbert – 22/32, 314 yards, 2 TD
- LV – Marcus Mariota – 17/28, 226 yards, TD, INT

**Top rushers**

- LAC – Austin Ekeler – 13 rushes, 60 yards
- LV – Marcus Mariota – 9 rushes, 88 yards, TD

**Top receivers**

- LAC – Jalen Guyton – 4 receptions, 91 yards
- LV – Darren Waller – 9 receptions, 150 yards, TD

Forced into action when a groin injury sidelined Derek Carr, backup quarterback Marcus Mariota made his debut as a Raider and threw for 226 yards, a touchdown, and an interception, and rushed for 88 yards and the tying score in the fourth quarter. This was Mariota's first appearance in a game since the 2019 AFC Championship game, when he was a member of the Tennessee Titans. The Chargers twice missed field goal attempts in the final six minutes of regulation.

==== Week 16: vs. Miami Dolphins ====
Week Sixteen: Miami Dolphins at Las Vegas Raiders – Game summary

Quarter	1	2	3	4	Total
**Dolphins**	3	3	7	13	**26**
Raiders	7	6	3	9	**25**

at Allegiant Stadium, Paradise, Nevada

- Date: December 26
- Game time: 5:15 pm. PST
- Game weather: None (indoor stadium)
- Game attendance: 0
- Referee: Tony Corrente
- TV announcers (NFLN): Joe Davis, Kurt Warner and Melissa Stark
- Recap, Game Book

Game information

**First quarter**

- LV – Derek Carr 1-yard run (Daniel Carlson kick), 8:25. Raiders 7–0. **Drive: 7 plays, 43 yards, 2:56.**
- MIA – Jason Sanders 37-yard field goal, 1:28. Raiders 7–3. **Drive: 12 plays, 56 yards, 6:57.**

**Second quarter**

- LV – Daniel Carlson 23-yard field goal, 6:51. Raiders 10–3. **Drive: 12 plays, 57 yards, 4:26.**
- MIA – Jason Sanders 39-yard field goal, 1:47. Raiders 10–6. **Drive: 11 plays, 54 yards, 5:04.**
- LV – Daniel Carlson 38-yard field goal, 0:16. Raiders 13–6. **Drive: 8 plays, 55 yards, 1:26.**

**Third quarter**

- MIA – Myles Gaskin 10-yard pass from Tua Tagovailoa (Jason Sanders kick), 10:38. Tied 13–13. **Drive: 9 plays, 75 yards, 4:29.**
- LV – Daniel Carlson 20-yard field goal, 2:34. Raiders 16–13. **Drive: 8 plays, 80 yards, 4:17.**

**Fourth quarter**

- MIA – Jason Sanders 22-yard field goal, 4:05. Tied 16–16. **Drive: 13 plays, 84 yards, 5:46.**
- LV – Nelson Agholor 85-yard pass from Derek Carr (kick failed), 3:37. Raiders 22–16. **Drive: 1 play, 75 yards, 0:24.**
- MIA – Myles Gaskin 59-yard pass from Ryan Fitzpatrick (Jason Sanders kick), 2:55. Dolphins 23–22. **Drive: 3 plays, 75 yards, 0:42.**
- LV – Daniel Carlson 22-yard field goal, 0:23. Raiders 25–23. **Drive: 7 plays, 71 yards, 2:32.**
- MIA – Jason Sanders 44-yard field goal, 0:06. Dolphins 26–25. **Drive: 3 plays, 49 yards, 0:13.**

**Top passers**

- MIA – Ryan Fitzpatrick – 9/13, 182 yards, TD
- LV – Derek Carr – 21/34, 336 yards, TD

**Top rushers**

- MIA – Myles Gaskin – 14 rush, 87 yards
- LV – Josh Jacobs – 13 rushes, 69 yards

**Top receivers**

- MIA – Myles Gaskin – 5 receptions, 82 yards, 2 TD
- LV – Nelson Agholor – 5 receptions, 155 yards, TD

The Raiders took a 13–6 lead at halftime, but the Dolphins were able to come back and tie the score at 16–16 with 4:01 remaining. Then both offenses exploded in the final few minutes to set up a wild finish. After a holding penalty on the Raiders, Carr completed a deep pass to Nelson Agholor, who then juked safety Bobby McCain and ran to the end zone for an 85-yard touchdown to put the Raiders up 22–16 after the missed extra point. The Dolphins then responded with a short pass from Ryan Fitzpatrick to Myles Gaskin, who broke a tackle and got some downfield blocks for a 59-yard touchdown to take the lead at 23–22 after the extra point. On the ensuing Raiders possession, Byron Jones was called for a penalty on another deep throw from Carr to Agholor, which set the Raiders up at the Dolphins' 22-yard line. The Raiders then ran out much of the clock and kicked a field goal to take a 25–23 lead with 0:19 remaining. On the first play of the Dolphins' next possession, Fitzpatrick completed an improbable 34-yard pass down the sideline to Mack Hollins with a defender dragging him down by the facemask as he threw the pass. The 15-yard facemask penalty put the Dolphins in field goal range, and after one incomplete pass, Jason Sanders' 44-yard field goal put the Dolphins ahead for good, 26–25. The Raiders fumbled on the ensuing kickoff and lateral, sealing the win for the Dolphins. With the close loss, the Raiders fell below .500 for the first time all season and were eliminated from playoff contention.

==== Week 17: at Denver Broncos ====
Week Seventeen: Las Vegas Raiders at Denver Broncos – Game summary

Quarter	1	2	3	4	Total
**Raiders**	3	14	0	15	**32**
Broncos	10	0	6	15	**31**

at Empower Field at Mile High, Denver, Colorado

- Date: January 3, 2021
- Game time: 2:25 p.m. MST/1:25 pm. PST
- Game weather: Partly cloudy, 53 °F (12 °C)
- Game attendance: 0
- Referee: Scott Novak
- TV announcers (CBS): Beth Mowins and Tiki Barber
- Recap, Game Book

Game information

**First quarter**

- DEN – Brandon McManus 22-yard field goal, 9:05. Broncos 3–0. **Drive: 11 plays, 68 yards, 4:28.**
- LV – Daniel Carlson 33-yard field goal, 4:34. Tied 3–3. **Drive: 9 plays, 60 yards, 4:31.**
- DEN – Troy Fumagalli 1-yard pass from Drew Lock (Brandon McManus kick), 0:17. Broncos 10–3. **Drive: 9 plays, 75 yards, 4:17.**

**Second quarter**

- LV – Darren Waller 28-yard pass from Derek Carr (Daniel Carlson kick), 11:15. Tied 10–10. **Drive: 5 plays, 54 yards, 2:44.**
- LV – Bryan Edwards 26-yard pass from Derek Carr (Daniel Carlson kick), 0:26. Raiders 17–10. **Drive: 6 plays, 56 yards, 1:13.**

**Third quarter**

- DEN – Brandon McManus 37-yard field goal, 11:21. Raiders 17–13. **Drive: 9 plays, 57 yards, 3:39.**
- DEN – Brandon McManus 26-yard field goal, 3:07. Raiders 17–16. **Drive: 6 plays, 30 yards, 2:52.**

**Fourth quarter**

- DEN – Melvin Gordon 10-yard run (Drew Lock–Jerry Jeudy pass), 14:54. Broncos 24–17. **Drive: 5 plays, 34 yards, 2:25.**
- LV – Josh Jacobs 28-yard run (Daniel Carlson kick), 7:27. Tied 24–24. **Drive: 9 plays, 90 yards, 4:12.**
- DEN – Jerry Jeudy 92-yard pass from Drew Lock (Brandon McManus kick), 6:29. Broncos 31–24. **Drive: 3 plays, 92 yards, 0:58.**
- LV – Josh Jacobs 1-yard run (Derek Carr–Darren Waller pass), 0:24. Raiders 32–31. **Drive: 7 plays, 77 yards, 1:23.**

**Top passers**

- LV – Derek Carr – 24/38, 371 yards, 2 TD, 2 INT
- DEN – Drew Lock – 25/41, 339 yards, 2 TD

**Top rushers**

- LV – Melvin Gordon – 26 rushes, 93 yards, TD
- DEN – Josh Jacobs – 15 rushes, 89 yards, 2 TD

**Top receivers**

- LV – Darren Waller – 9 receptions, 117 yards, TD
- DEN – Jerry Jeudy – 5 receptions, 140 yards, TD

The Raiders led 17–10 at halftime, but the Broncos later attempted a rally and, in a repeat of the previous week for the Raiders, the lead changed four times in the fourth quarter. This time, however, the Raiders would prevail, as Derek Carr led a touchdown drive and a successful two-point conversion, and then the Raiders special teams blocked a last-second field goal try by the Broncos.

=== Standings ===
==== Division ====
AFC West
	W	L	T	PCT	DIV	CONF	PF	PA	STK
^{(1)} Kansas City Chiefs	14	2	0	.875	4–2	10–2	473	362	L1
Las Vegas Raiders	8	8	0	.500	4–2	6–6	434	478	W1
Los Angeles Chargers	7	9	0	.438	3–3	6–6	384	426	W4
Denver Broncos	5	11	0	.313	1–5	4–8	323	446	L3

==== Conference ====
AFC
#	Team	Division	W	L	T	PCT	DIV	CONF	SOS	SOV	STK
**Division leaders**
1	Kansas City Chiefs	West	14	2	0	.875	4–2	10–2	.465	.464	L1
2	Buffalo Bills	East	13	3	0	.813	6–0	10–2	.512	.471	W6
3	Pittsburgh Steelers	North	12	4	0	.750	4–2	9–3	.475	.448	L1
4 (Note: Tennessee finished ahead of Indianapolis in the AFC South based on division record.)	Tennessee Titans	South	11	5	0	.688	5–1	8–4	.475	.398	W1
**Wild cards**
5 (Note: Baltimore claimed the No. 5 seed over Indianapolis based on head-to-head victory. Division tiebreaker used to eliminate Cleveland (see below).) (Note: Baltimore claimed the No. 5 seed over Cleveland based on head-to-head sweep.)	Baltimore Ravens	North	11	5	0	.688	4–2	7–5	.494	.401	W5
6 (Note: Cleveland claimed the No. 6 seed over Indianapolis based on head-to-head victory.)	Cleveland Browns	North	11	5	0	.688	3–3	7–5	.451	.406	W1
7	Indianapolis Colts	South	11	5	0	.688	4–2	7–5	.443	.384	W1
**Did not qualify for the postseason**
8	Miami Dolphins	East	10	6	0	.625	3–3	7–5	.467	.347	L1
9	Las Vegas Raiders	West	8	8	0	.500	4–2	6–6	.539	.477	W1
10 (Note: New England finished ahead of the LA Chargers based on head-to-head victory.)	New England Patriots	East	7	9	0	.438	3–3	6–6	.527	.429	W1
11	Los Angeles Chargers	West	7	9	0	.438	3–3	6–6	.482	.344	W4
12	Denver Broncos	West	5	11	0	.313	1–5	4–8	.566	.388	L3
13	Cincinnati Bengals	North	4	11	1	.281	1–5	4–8	.529	.438	L1
14	Houston Texans	South	4	12	0	.250	2–4	3–9	.541	.219	L5
15	New York Jets	East	2	14	0	.125	0–6	1–11	.594	.656	L1
16	Jacksonville Jaguars	South	1	15	0	.063	1–5	1–11	.549	.688	L15
**Tiebreakers** (Note: When breaking ties for three or more teams under the NFL's rules, they are first broken within divisions, then comparing only the highest ranked remaining team from each division.)
