= Darren Mack =

American murderer (born 1961)

Darren Roy Mack
- Born: January 31, 1961 (age 65); Reno, Nevada, U.S.
- Occupations: Part-owner, Palace Jewelry & Loan, Merchant, eBay
- Spouse(s): Debra Ashlock (ex-wife), Charla Mack (deceased)
- Children: 3
- Parent: Joan Mack
- Status: Incarcerated
- Convictions: First degree murder Attempted murder with a deadly weapon
- Penalty: 36 years to life in prison

Details
- Imprisoned at: Lovelock Correctional Center

Darren Roy Mack (born January 31, 1961) is an American murderer who was convicted for the killing of his estranged wife, Charla Mack, and the attempted murder of Family Court Judge Chuck Weller, who was handling the couple's divorce. Mack pleaded guilty to his wife's murder and took an Alford plea on the attempted murder charges.

On the morning of June 12, 2006, Charla Mack was found stabbed to death in her garage. Judge Weller was shot a few hours later on the same day.

Mack fled to Mexico but ultimately gave himself up in Puerto Vallarta on June 22, 2006. He was returned to the Reno, Nevada under custody of the Washoe County Sheriff the next day.

Just before his jury trial was set to start, on November 5, 2007, Mack pleaded guilty to the first-degree murder of his wife and entered an Alford plea on the charge of the attempted murder of Judge Weller. The court sentenced him to life for the first plea and to the maximum of 40 years for the second, with the sentences to run consecutively. Parole was set to not available for at least 16 years.

Mack's daughter and his wife's estate filed a civil suit against Mack for the wrongful death of Charla Mack. In 2008, a Washoe County jury convicted him and approved a $590 million settlement against Mack in this case. Mack has attempted to appeal his convictions and the civil suit, so far unsuccessfully. He is currently incarcerated at Lovelock Correctional Center near Lovelock, Nevada.

== Biography ==
=== Early life ===
Darren Mack grew up in northern Nevada and Reno; he has a brother, Landon. From an early age, they learned to hunt and to deal with wildlife. Darren Mack graduated from Reno High School, a local public school. He attended the University of Nevada on a baseball scholarship.

== Career ==
Mack had started to take part in his mother Joan Mack's family-owned Palace Jewelry and Loan pawn shop from the age of seven. After college he joined the family business, in addition to pursuing some of his own interests. By 2006 he was a part-owner and eBay merchant.

In 2003 his income was estimated at $500,000 annually, and his net worth at $9.4 million. According to his brother Landon, Mack was active politically and founded the Nevada Pawnbroker Association.

=== Marriages ===
In 1986 Mack married Debra Ashlock; they divorced in 1991 after having a son and daughter together. According to a 2006 article in The Union, this was Mack's second marriage.

Mack married Charla Sampsel on May 13, 1995. They had a daughter together and were also involved in raising his two children by his first (or second) marriage. In 1998, a billboard in Reno announced: "The Mack Family Presents: Darren Mack. 1998 Father/Husband of the Year. A unanimous decision by his wife, Charla, and his three wonderful children."

Charla filed for divorce on February 7, 2005, when their daughter was seven years old. Charla reportedly told a family friend after they separated, "He's out to get me and someday he will probably kill me."

== Events ==
By 2006, the couple had separated and were going through acrimonious divorce proceedings. Charla Mack, aged 39, was found stabbed to death in her garage on June 12, 2006. A few hours later on the same day, Family Court Judge Weller was shot by a sniper, suffering serious injury. He had ordered an interim financial settlement that Mack reportedly resented.

The estranged husband Darren Mack was soon identified as the chief suspect in both crimes, because of the couple's acrimonious divorce proceedings and his resentment about the financial settlement ordered. He became the subject of an international manhunt in June 2006 after being charged with these deaths.

Judge Weller spent time recovering, and returned to his courtroom on August 16.

According to a close friend, Mack was angry over the May divorce settlement issued by Judge Weller. In addition to child support (capped by state law at $849 per month), Darren Mack was ordered to pay $10,000 per month for spousal support and household expenses. Darren Mack's gross monthly income was approximately $44,000 (528,000/yr), while his wife had no income.

Mack evaded police for 10 days, becoming the subject of a manhunt. He was featured on the Fox show America's Most Wanted and the FBI's Most Wanted website.

Mack was a hunter and sportsman. Records show he owned a .40-caliber Smith & Wesson handgun and a Bushmaster .223 semi-automatic rifle. Police said he possessed a federal firearms license and permit to carry a concealed weapon. A police search of his apartment found ammunition and bomb materials.

On June 22, 2006, Mack surrendered to Mexican authorities after they surrounded him at a resort's pool in Puerto Vallarta. The following day he was flown to Dallas, Texas for booking, and returned to Reno, where he was booked into the Washoe County jail. Authorities located Mack's rented silver Ford Explorer in Ensenada.

== Trial ==
Mack was originally defended by attorneys Scott Freeman of Reno and David Chesnoff of Las Vegas. Chesnoff had built a national reputation by representing celebrities such as Martha Stewart and Britney Spears.

The case was complicated because of individuals having had relationships with Mack. The Washoe County District Attorney recused his office from the case because of a longstanding personal relationship with Darren Mack, and because he could be a witness.

Chief Deputy DA Robert Daskas and Assistant DA Christopher Lalli of the Clark County District Attorney's office were designated to conduct the prosecution.

At a preliminary hearing on August 30, 2006, Mack was held over for trial. His defense attorneys sought a court-ordered mental competency evaluation. On September 11, the prosecutor announced he would not seek the death penalty.

Mack pleaded not guilty to the charges at an arraignment on September 13. As of October 4, 2006, attorney Scott Freeman tried to get Mack's attempted murder charge dropped. His trial was set for October 1, 2007.

Following his earlier decision in the criminal cases, on October 13 Senior Judge J. Charles Thompson disqualified the entire Washoe County bench from all civil cases against Mack. Charla Mack's estate and attorneys on behalf of her daughter filed civil cases for damages in the wrongful death of Charla.

The trial was moved to Las Vegas. Clark County District Judge Douglas Herndon was appointed to the case.

On November 5, 2007, Mack pleaded guilty to first-degree murder of his ex-wife and entered an Alford plea to the attempted murder charge of Judge Weller. This was just before the trial was to begin, in exchange for a recommendation by the prosecutor for life in prison with parole available after 20 years. The judge was not bound by this sentencing recommendation. Mack said during the plea, "I do understand right now in my state of mind that shooting at the judiciary is not a proper form of political redress".

Mack later hired a new defense attorney, William Routsis, and attempted to withdraw his pleas. He said he was coerced by Chesnoff and Freeman and that his signature was forged. Judge Douglas Herndon denied Mack's motion to withdraw, which was filed by his new attorney. During Mack's sentencing, Routsis continued to renew his requests for Herndon to grant Mack a new trial.

Under the terms of the plea agreement, Herndon sentenced Mack to life in prison for murdering his wife. For the attempted murder of Judge Weller, with a deadly weapon enhancement, he sentenced Mack to the maximum of 40 years, with parole eligibility after 16 years. The sentences are to run consecutively, rendering Mack ineligible for parole for at least 36 years. Another hearing on his arguments was scheduled for April 2008.

On March 18, 2008, a Washoe County jury delivered a $590 million settlement against Mack in the wrongful-death lawsuit of his wife, Charla. $560 million was awarded to the couple's young daughter, Erika, with the remainder to go to his wife's estate.

=== Appeals ===
Mack continues to appeal his conviction on the grounds that he pleaded guilty under duress. He is also appealing the $590 million civil judgment. Judge Weller has filed a personal injury civil lawsuit against Mack, seeking compensatory and punitive damages.

Mack's appeal, which was based on the argument that the judge should have allowed him to withdraw his guilty plea, was heard by the Nevada Supreme Court in 2010, which denied it. In February 2012, Mack raised this issue again in a petition filed in United States District Court.

== See also ==
- List of homicides in Nevada
- America's Most Wanted
