= Dan Ventrelle =

American businessman

- Born: Daniel Michael Ventrelle; 1976 (age 49–50); Chicago, Illinois, U.S.
- Education: University of Notre Dame, University of Michigan Law School
- Occupation: Businessman
- Known for: Vice President of talent for WWE. Former Interim President of the Las Vegas Raiders
- Spouse: Chrissa Ventrelle
- Children: 3

Daniel Michael Ventrelle (born 1976) is an American businessman. Ventrelle is the former executive vice president of talent for WWE. Previously, he served as the president of the Las Vegas Raiders of the National Football League (NFL) from July 2021 until May 2022, and had before that was the team's executive vice president and general counsel.

== Early years ==
Ventrelle, a native of Chicago, Illinois, attended the University of Notre Dame and the University of Michigan Law School.

== Professional career ==
=== Early career ===
Prior to joining the Raiders full-time, Ventrelle served as outside counsel to the club at Howard Rice Nemerovski Canady Falk & Rabkin in San Francisco, California.

=== Oakland / Las Vegas Raiders ===
In 2003, Ventrelle joined the then Oakland Raiders. He rose through the ranks and became an executive vice president and general counsel. Along with owner Mark Davis and then-Raiders president Marc Badain, Ventrelle played a key role in the Raiders' relocation to Las Vegas and the building of a new stadium.

On July 19, 2021, Ventrelle was named the president of the Las Vegas Raiders following the resignation of Marc Badain on the same day.

Following the conclusion of the 2021 season, Ventrelle remained in the role of president. Ventrelle worked to embed the Raiders organization in the Las Vegas community, championing issues such as the Raiders’ vaccine verification project and bringing the high school state championship football games to Allegiant Stadium. In May 2022, the Raiders announced that Ventrelle was no longer with the organization.

=== WWE ===
On September 8, 2022, Ventrelle was appointed executive vice president of talent for WWE. On April 11, 2024, Ventrelle was removed as executive vice president of talent for WWE.
