= Henry Ruggs =

American football player (born 1999)

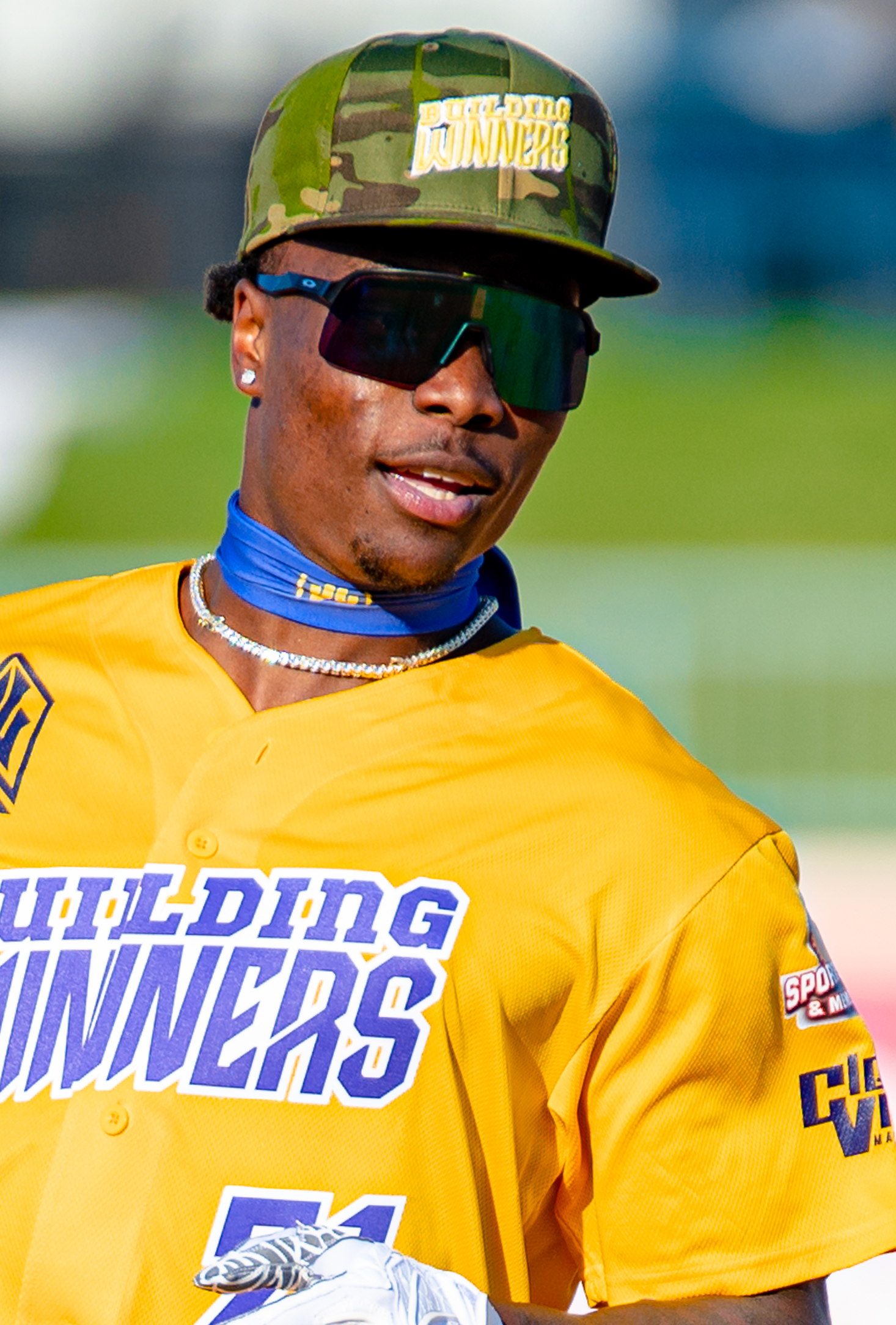
- Ruggs in 2021

No. 11
- Position: Wide receiver

Personal information
- Born: January 24, 1999 (age 27); Montgomery, Alabama, U.S.
- Listed height: 5 ft 11 in (1.80 m)
- Listed weight: 188 lb (85 kg)

Career information
- High school: Robert E. Lee (Montgomery)
- College: Alabama (2017–2019)
- NFL draft: 2020: 1st round, 12th overall pick

Career history
- Las Vegas Raiders (2020–2021)

Awards and highlights
- CFP national champion (2017)

Career NFL statistics
- Games played: 20
- Games started: 19
- Receptions: 50
- Receiving yards: 921
- Rushing yards: 65
- Total touchdowns: 4
- Stats at Pro Football Reference

Henry James Ruggs III (born January 24, 1999) is an American former professional football wide receiver who played in the National Football League (NFL) for two seasons with the Las Vegas Raiders. He played college football for the Alabama Crimson Tide, where he was a member of the team that won the 2018 College Football Playoff National Championship. Ruggs was selected by the Raiders in the first round of the 2020 NFL draft.

During his second season, Ruggs caused a motor vehicle collision that killed the driver of another car. He was released by the Raiders the same day. Ruggs pleaded guilty to driving under the influence and vehicular manslaughter in 2023 and was sentenced to between three and ten years in a Nevada state prison.

== Early life ==
Henry James Ruggs III grew up in Montgomery, Alabama. In the eighth grade, he was promoted to the varsity football team for the final two games of its season. He attended Robert E. Lee High School. He did not play high school football until his junior year and received his first scholarship offer after just his second game on the gridiron. As a senior, he had 38 catches for 639 yards in nine games. He scored 20 touchdowns: nine catches, seven rushes, three passes, and one kick return. Ruggs also played basketball and ran track in high school; his 100-meter dash time of 10.58 seconds was the Alabama High School Athletic Association's class 7A record. In 2017, 247Sports.com ranked him as the second-best high school football player in Alabama. Ruggs received scholarship offers from more than 20 colleges to play football; he chose the University of Alabama.

== College career ==
As a true freshman at Alabama in 2017, Ruggs had 12 receptions for 229 yards and six touchdowns. As a sophomore in 2018, he had 46 receptions for 741 yards and 11 touchdowns. As a junior in 2019, he had 40 receptions for 746 receiving yards and seven receiving touchdowns. During his junior season, Ruggs was also the team's primary kick returner and averaged 23.8 yards per return. His 24 total career receiving touchdowns places him third on Alabama's all-time leaderboard. On January 6, 2020, Ruggs announced that he would forgo his true senior year and enter the 2020 NFL draft.

== Professional career ==
=== Pre-draft ===
Pre-draft measurables
Height	Weight	Arm length	Hand span	Wingspan	40-yard dash	10-yard split	20-yard split	Vertical jump	Broad jump	Wonderlic
5 ft 11 in (1.80 m)	188 lb (85 kg)	30 1/2 in (0.77 m)	10 1/8 in (0.26 m)	6 ft 2 1/2 in (1.89 m)	4.27 s	1.43 s	2.52 s	42.0 in (1.07 m)	10 ft 11 in (3.33 m)	20
All values from NFL Combine

Ruggs ran a 4.27-second 40-yard dash at the 2020 NFL Combine that was the year's fastest time by any prospect by .08 seconds, and it tied for the fourth-fastest ever at the event since electronic timing began in 1999. Ruggs' vertical jump was measured 42 inches, tied for second-best among wide receivers at the 2020 combine.

=== 2020 ===
At the 2020 NFL draft, Ruggs was the first wide receiver to be drafted. The Las Vegas Raiders selected him with the 12th overall pick, their first since moving from Oakland earlier in the year. Ruggs was also the Raiders' second consecutive first-round pick of a player from the University of Alabama, joining 2019 first round running back Josh Jacobs. On July 21, 2020, Ruggs signed a fully guaranteed four-year contract worth $16.67 million, with a team option for a fifth year.

On September 13, 2020, Ruggs made his NFL debut in the season opener against the Carolina Panthers, including making his first career catch. During Week 5 against the Kansas City Chiefs, Ruggs recorded his first 100-yard game, with 118 receiving yards, which included his first career touchdown, a 72-yard reception. He was placed on the reserve/COVID-19 list by the team on December 15, 2020, and activated on December 24. Ruggs finished his rookie year with 26 receptions, 452 receiving yards, and two touchdowns in 13 games played.

=== 2021 ===
In the 2021 season, Ruggs had 24 receptions, 469 receiving yards, and two touchdowns in seven games.

Ruggs was released on November 2, 2021, the day he was involved in a drunk driving car crash which killed the other driver. His stint with the Raiders of less than two seasons totaled 20 games, 1,197 all-purpose yards, and four touchdowns.

== Career statistics ==
=== NFL ===
Legend
**Bold**	Career high

Year	Team	Games		Receiving					Rushing					Returning					Fumbles	
Year	Team	GP	GS	Rec	Yds	Avg	Lng	TD	Att	Yds	Avg	Lng	TD	Ret	Yds	Avg	Lng	TD	Fum	Lost
2020	LV	**13**	**12**	**26**	452	17.4	**72T**	**2**	**9**	**49**	**5.4**	**12**	0	**7**	**141**	**20.1**	**32**	0	**2**	**2**
2021	LV	7	7	24	**469**	**19.5**	61T	**2**	3	16	5.3	7	0	4	70	17.5	22	0	0	0
Career		20	19	50	921	18.4	72T	4	12	65	5.4	12	0	11	211	19.2	32	0	2	2

=== College ===
Season	Team	Class	GP	Receiving			
Season	Team	Class	GP	Rec	Yds	Avg	TD
2017	Alabama	FR	14	12	229	19.1	6
2018	Alabama	SO	14	46	741	16.1	11
2019	Alabama	JR	12	40	746	18.7	7
Career			40	98	1,716	17.5	24

== Personal life ==
Ruggs credits his friend Roderic Scott with encouraging him to play football in high school. Scott died in a car crash at 17 years of age, and Ruggs would honor him with a three-fingered salute after every touchdown because Scott wore number 3 on the basketball court. Ruggs' brother Kevontae played college football for Ole Miss in 2018 before transferring to East Mississippi Community College in 2019.

In April 2020, Ruggs partnered with Three Square, a southern Nevada food bank, to donate meals to those in need because of the COVID-19 pandemic.

On May 7, 2020, Ruggs' daughter was born to his long-term girlfriend Kiara Kilgo-Washington, nicknamed Rudy.

In December 2025, it was reported that Ruggs completed his bachelor's degree from the University of Alabama with a 4.0 GPA. Ruggs was named on the President's List his final semester.

== 2021 fatal car crash ==
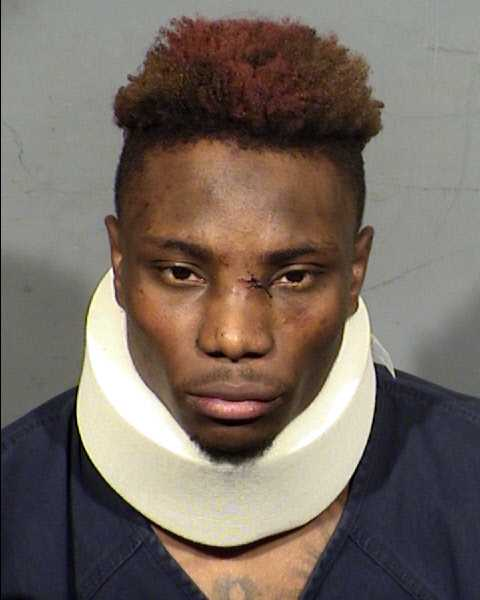
A mugshot of Ruggs in 2021, following his arrest for felony driving under the influence (DUI). He is wearing a neck brace.

On November 2, 2021, Ruggs rear-ended another car at high speed in Spring Valley, outside of Las Vegas. 23-year-old Tina Tintor and her golden retriever, Max, were burned to death in the fatal collision, according to Las Vegas Metropolitan Police and county prosecutors. Ruggs was charged with driving under the influence resulting in death and reckless driving.

Hours before the incident, Ruggs and his girlfriend, Kiara Kilgo-Washington, were seen drinking at a Topgolf location on the Las Vegas Strip in Paradise. They left after midnight in his Chevrolet Corvette. Police produced digital evidence shortly thereafter showing that, at approximately 3:39 a.m., driving at 156 miles per hour (251 km/h), Ruggs slammed into the Toyota RAV4 driven by Tintor. The Clark County Coroner determined that Tintor and her dog burned to death as her vehicle was engulfed in flames following the collision.

Ruggs and Kilgo-Washington were transported to the University Medical Center of Southern Nevada (UMCSN) with non-life-threatening injuries.

=== Legal proceedings ===
Upon his release from the hospital, the Las Vegas Metropolitan Police Department booked Ruggs into the Clark County Detention Center. He appeared in court the following day, and Judge Joe M. Bonaventure set bail at $150,000.

Police reports showed that Ruggs had refused to take a field sobriety test, and his blood test, taken two hours following the crash, revealed a blood alcohol content of 0.161%, over the legal limit in Nevada. Ruggs' defense attorney, David Chesnoff, argued that Ruggs was unable to submit to a field sobriety test because of the injuries he sustained in the accident, and claimed that the blood test should not be admissible as evidence since the police did not have probable cause to obtain a blood test. Justice of the Peace Ann Zimmerman rejected Chesnoff's arguments and ruled the blood test admissible as evidence in the case.

On May 10, 2023, as part of a plea agreement, Ruggs pleaded guilty to one count of felony DUI resulting in death and one count of misdemeanor vehicular manslaughter. Prosecutors said they reached a plea deal due to concerns the blood draw would be thrown out, and with it the only evidence to support the felony DUI charge. They were not willing to chance Ruggs only facing charges of reckless driving, which could have only resulted in probation. He was sentenced on August 9, 2023, to spend between three and ten years at High Desert State Prison in Nevada.

By 2024, Ruggs was working at the Nevada Governor's Mansion whilst serving his sentence under the community trustee inmates program. Ruggs is up for parole in 2026, and he is eligible for credit for time served as part of his work program.

As of December 2025, the Nevada Department of Corrections reported that Ruggs has been transferred from a minimum-security transitional housing facility in Las Vegas to a medium-security prison in northern Nevada, for undisclosed reasons. He was denied parole by the Nevada Board of Parole Commissioners on June 11, 2026.

=== Response ===
The Las Vegas Raiders released Ruggs hours after the incident on November 2, 2021.

Various football players and coaches made public statements. Derek Carr, a former Raiders teammate, said Ruggs needs to be loved and that "if no one else will do it, I'll do it". Interim head coach Rich Bisaccia said, "We want to express our sincere condolences to the victim's family". Kadarius Toney, then on the New York Giants, drew criticism for seeming to ignore the gravity of the situation and excuse Ruggs when he tweeted, "We young…..everybody make mistakes… he know he messed up don't drag em for it……that's goofy to me…." Nick Saban, who coached Ruggs at Alabama, said, "We're going to support him through it, but we also have a lot of compassion for the victims, and our thoughts and prayers are also with them."

Quarterbacks Tua Tagovailoa and Jalen Hurts, who both played with Ruggs at Alabama, also spoke on the matter. Tagovailoa said, "You'd never think this guy could hurt a soul, so when you see something like that – I mean, I'm still kind of in disbelief. But, obviously my heart goes out to the family that has been affected by it. But my heart also goes out to Henry as my teammate, ex-teammate." Hurts said, "It's unfortunate to see a situation like that unfold, and I'll just kind of leave it at that. It hurts my heart for everybody involved."
