= Terrance Watanabe =

American businessman and high roller (born 1957)

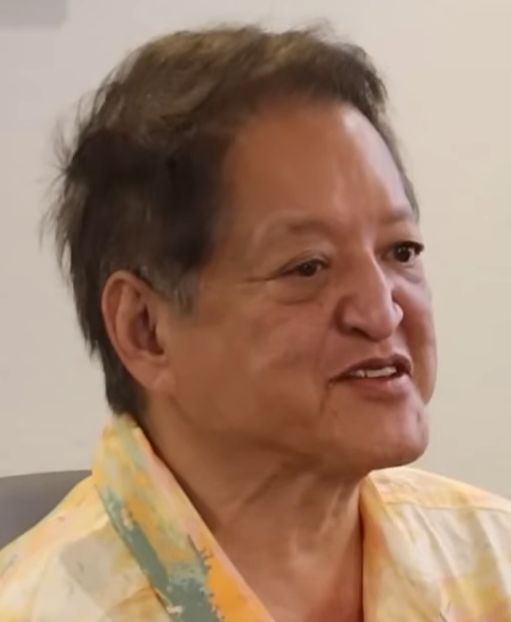
- Watanabe in 2025
- Born: November 14, 1957 (age 68); Omaha, Nebraska, U.S.
- Occupation: Businessman
- Employer: Oriental Trading Company (1977–2000)
- Known for: Being a high roller in Las Vegas

Terrance K. Watanabe (born November 14, 1957) is an American businessman and high roller who inherited Oriental Trading Company, a company selling party supplies, arts and crafts, toys, novelties, and school supplies founded by his father Harry Watanabe. Terrance is known for successfully expanding the family business and for gambling extremely large amounts of money at casinos in Las Vegas.

Born in Omaha, Nebraska, Watanabe became president of the company in 1977; he later became CEO and turned the company from a carnival supplier into a party goods one. In 2000, he sold his stake in the company and retired, becoming a philanthropist and donating millions towards AIDS research. He then moved to Las Vegas, where he developed a compulsive gambling addiction at the Wynn and Caesars Palace. In total, Watanabe lost an estimated $204 million and faced four criminal charges on theft and passing bad checks, all of which were later dropped.

== Early life ==
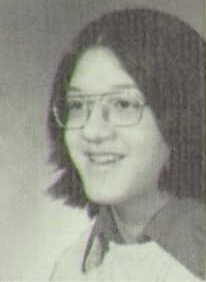
Watanabe at Harry A. Burke High School in 1973

Watanabe was born on November 14, 1957, in Omaha, Nebraska. Both his parents were gamblers. He was 14 when he gambled at a casino for the first time.

== Career ==
When Watanabe became president and part owner of Oriental Trading Company in 1977, he shifted the company's focus from carnivals to supplying party goods for churches, schools, retailers, and individuals.

In 2000, Watanabe sold his stake in the company to Los Angeles-based private equity firm Brentwood Associates and resigned as CEO and president. He became a philanthropist, donating millions to AIDS research and founding the Terrance K. Watanabe Charitable Trust.

== Gambling ==
After selling his company, Watanabe became known for his lavish gambling habits. In 2007, he was reported to have lost $127 million at Caesars Palace and The Rio in Las Vegas after having gambled a total of $825 million. He was banned from Wynn Las Vegas for compulsive gambling. Watanabe is estimated to have lost approximately $204 million.

Caesars Entertainment was fined $225,000 by the New Jersey Gaming Commission for allowing Watanabe to continue gambling in a highly intoxicated state, though Watanabe's losses occurred in Las Vegas. Caesars alleges that Watanabe "was using marijuana and/or cocaine and made sexual advances toward employees". Caesars Rewards created a special tier for him known as "Chairman" which ranks above "Seven Stars". Watanabe received "tickets to the Rolling Stones, $12,500 a month for airfare, and $500,000 in credit at the gift stores. Harrah's also offered 15% cash back on table losses greater than $500,000, special high-limit games, and other incentives." In 2007, he alone made up 5.6% of Harrah's Entertainment's entire Las Vegas gambling revenue.

In 2022, Foundation Media Partners acquired the rights to Watanabe's story.

== Personal life ==
In 2017, Watanabe announced he had prostate cancer, and he began a GoFundMe campaign to raise $100,000 for an operation. In a 2025 interview, he stated that while he had only raised $29,000, it was enough for the operation and was cancer-free. He also announced that he was diagnosed with bipolar disorder.
