= Tom Alexandrovich =

Israeli civil servant

- טום (ארטיום) אלכסנדרוביץ'
- Born: Tom Artiom Alexandrovich
- Citizenship: Israel

Tom Artiom Alexandrovich (Hebrew: טום (ארטיום) אלכסנדרוביץ'; born 1987 or 1986) is an Israeli civil servant, on leave since 16 August 2025 from the role of director of the Cyber Defense Division at Israel's National Cyber Security Authority. Alexandrovich had worked for Israeli government agencies for 14 years as of 2025.

== Career ==
Alexandrovich is a veteran of the Israel Defense Forces (IDF). At the Israel National Cyber Directorate (INCD), he has worked on projects to defend against ransomware groups' use of remote control tools in cyber attacks, including deployment of malware. More recently, he has overseen Israel's response to the use of cryptocurrency by anti-Israel groups, including Hamas, before and after the attacks of October 7. He has also contributed to the country's "Cyber Dome" to protect civilian cyberspace.

He was a recipient of the Israel Defense Prize for achievements in cyber in 2021. His native language is Russian, he is fluent in Hebrew, and has a conversational understanding of English.

== Publications ==
Alexandrovich co-edited Aviation Cybersecurity: Foundations, Principles, and Applications (2021).

== Arrest and felony charges in 2025 ==
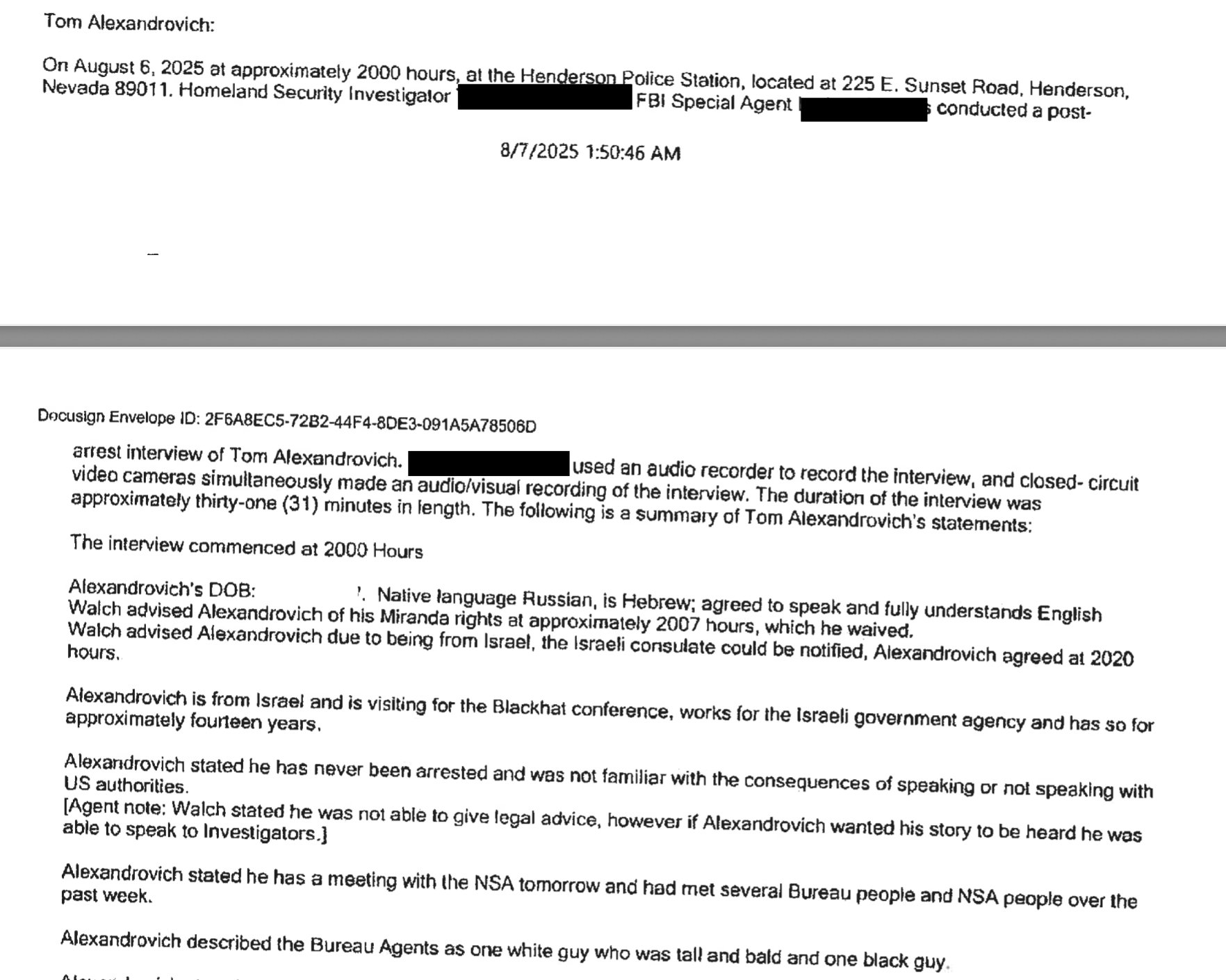
Alexandrovich arrest report Henderson PD case #25-14695

In August 2025, Alexandrovich was in Las Vegas, Nevada to attend the annual Black Hat computer security conference.

=== Arrest ===
While at the conference, he chatted online with an FBI decoy posing as a 15-year-old girl about meeting for "sexual contact". Alexandrovich was among 8 individuals arrested during a 2-week joint undercover sting operation by Las Vegas police and the FBI targeting child sex predators.

Alexandrovich was arrested in a child sex predator sting operation in Henderson, Nevada, about 16 miles (26 km) southeast of downtown Las Vegas. He was charged with luring a child for a sex act, a felony that carries up to 10 years in prison, and booked into detention. Las Vegas police said the suspects were investigated on suspicion of luring a minor by computer for sexual relations.

Alexandrovich had not yet been "formally charged with a crime, but faced a potential felony charge of luring a child with a computer for sex, according to the August 15 police statement". According to court documents, he posted $10,000 bail as did most of the other seven men after their arrests.

Despite his lack of diplomatic immunity, Alexandrovich skipped bail and returned to Israel two days later. Upon his return to Israel, he was officially placed on leave from the Israeli Cyber Directorate and any other government service.

=== Court proceedings ===
His arraignment in court before a judge was scheduled for August 27, 2025; however, he failed to appear despite being required by Nevada State law to do so.

His lawyers said that he had a deal with the district attorney to not have to appear in person, which was denied by the judge, who held that the DA had no authority to grant such a request. Alexandrovich's lawyers then arranged for him to appear remotely via Zoom. Alexandrovich appeared virtually in Henderson, Nevada Justice Court on September 3, 2025.

Alexandrovich appeared again in court via video on October 28, 2025 and was formally charged with a child sex crime of luring a child with the intent to engage in sexual conduct. He pleaded not guilty.

In November 2025, the judge refused to dismiss the case, saying that Alexandrovich "continued communications after the decoy explicitly disclosed being 15. The chats … contained discussions about sexual conduct. [Alexandrovich] agreed on items associated with sexual activity. [Alexandrovich] made statements encouraging the minor to create a ruse to leave her home. [Alexandrovich] drove to the approximate location of the agreed-upon meet up." The judge set a trial date for March 2026.

=== Reactions ===
Israeli Prime Minister Benjamin Netanyahu’s office initially and incorrectly denied that Alexandrovich had been arrested, saying "A state employee who traveled to the U.S. for professional matters was questioned by American authorities during his stay ... The employee, who does not hold a diplomatic visa, was not arrested and returned to Israel as scheduled.” In response to the incident, the Cyber Directorate claimed that "the directorate has not received additional details through authorized channels to date. Should such details be received, the directorate will act accordingly. At this stage, by joint decision, the employee has gone on leave to deal with the matter until things become clear."

Nevada's Acting U.S. Attorney, Sigal Chattah, stated that the prosecution was being handled by the Clark County District Attorney's office, not federal authorities, and criticized Nevada state authorities for not requiring Alexandrovich to surrender his passport, which is how he was able to flee the country. Chattah further noted that Attorney General Pam Bondi and FBI Director Kash Patel expressed concern over the incident and called for Alexandrovich's immediate return to the United States to face justice. On August 18, 2025, the United States Department of State issued a statement that it had no role in his release to Israel.
