= Marc Badain =

American executive (born 1970/71)

- Born: Marc Badain; 1970 or 1971 (age 55–56); Rochester, New York
- Education: University of California, Berkeley Haas School of Business (MBA)
- Occupation: Businessman
- Known for: Former President of the Las Vegas Raiders

Marc Badain (born 1970 or 1971) is an American businessman and executive. He is currently president of the Athletics of Major League Baseball. Previously, he was the president of the Las Vegas Raiders of the National Football League (NFL) from 2013 until his resignation on July 19, 2021 and Oak View Group's Las Vegas sports & entertainment venues from 2022 until 2025. He previously was the Raiders chief financial officer.

== Professional career ==
=== Oakland / Las Vegas Raiders ===
Beginning with the team as a summer intern for the then Los Angeles Raiders in 1991. Badain attended University of California, Berkeley Haas School of Business, graduating in 2001 with an MBA. Badain rose through the ranks eventually becoming the chief financial officer for the team and an assistant to previous CEO Amy Trask in 2006. After the resignation of Trask in 2013, Badain became the interim president of the team. In 2015, Raiders owner Mark Davis promoted him to the permanent role of president, making the announcement in the same press conference that Jack Del Rio was announced as head coach.

One of Badain's major tasks upon assuming the position of president was to help secure a new stadium for the team to replace the Oakland–Alameda County Coliseum in Oakland. He was seen as instrumental to securing the team's new stadium in Las Vegas, Nevada.

On July 19, 2021, Badain resigned his role as president of the team. In a statement Badain said that after completing the move to Las Vegas and finishing Allegiant Stadium it was time to move on to other endeavors after 30 years in the Raiders organization.

=== Oak View Group ===
In June 2022, it was announced he had been hired by Oak View Group to serve as president of their Las Vegas venue division which is planning on building a hotel and casino and a venue capable of hosting a National Basketball Association (NBA) expansion team.

=== Athletics ===
On March 3, 2025, Badain was announced as President of the Athletics of Major League Baseball, succeeding Dave Kaval.
