= Las Vegas Raiders =

NFL team in the Las Vegas metropolitan area

- Current season
Logo	Wordmark
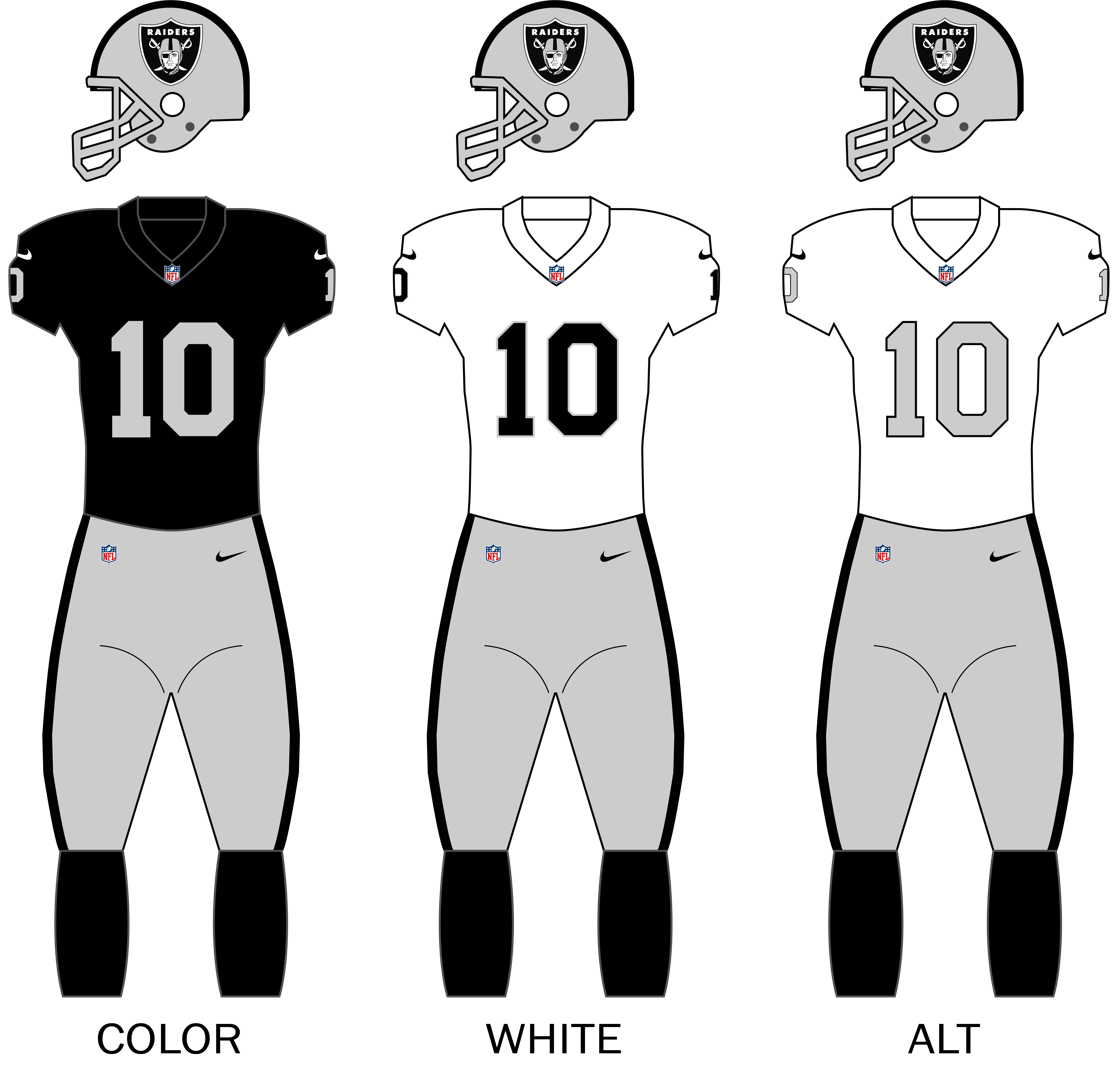
- Uniforms

General information
- Founded: January 30, 1960; 66 years ago
- Stadium: Allegiant Stadium; Paradise, Nevada
- Headquartered: Intermountain Health Performance Center; Henderson, Nevada
- Colors: Silver, black
- Fight song: "The Autumn Wind"
- Mascot: Raider Rusher
- Website: raiders.com

Personnel
- Owner: Mark Davis
- General manager: John Spytek
- Head coach: Klint Kubiak
- President: Sandra Douglass Morgan

Nicknames
- Silver and Black; Men in Black; Team of the Decades; The World's Team; Malosos ("Bad Boys"; Mexican fan base)

Team history
- Oakland Raiders (1960–1981, 1995–2019); Los Angeles Raiders (1982–1994); Las Vegas Raiders (2020–present)

Home fields
- Kezar Stadium (1960); Candlestick Park (1961); Frank Youell Field (1962–1965); Oakland Coliseum (1966–1981, 1995–2019); Los Angeles Memorial Coliseum (1982–1994); Allegiant Stadium (2020–present)

League / conference affiliations
- American Football League (1960–1969): Western Division (1960–1969); National Football League (1970–present): American Football Conference (1970–present); AFC West (1970–present)

Championships
- League championships: 3†: AFL championships (pre-1970 AFL–NFL merger): 1 1967; Super Bowl championships: 3 1976 (XI), 1980 (XV), 1983 (XVIII); † – Does not include 1967 AFL championship won during the same season that the Super Bowl was contested
- Conference championships: 4: AFC: 1976, 1980, 1983, 2002
- Division championships: 15: AFL West: 1967, 1968, 1969; AFC West: 1970, 1972, 1973, 1974, 1975, 1976, 1983, 1985, 1990, 2000, 2001, 2002

Playoff appearances (23)
- AFL: 1967, 1968, 1969; NFL: 1970, 1972, 1973, 1974, 1975, 1976, 1977, 1980, 1982, 1983, 1984, 1985, 1990, 1991, 1993, 2000, 2001, 2002, 2016, 2021

Owners
- Chet Soda (1960); F. Wayne Valley (1960–1971); Al Davis (1972–2011); Mark & Carol Davis (2011–2025); Mark Davis (2025–present)

The Las Vegas Raiders are a professional American football team based in the Las Vegas metropolitan area. The Raiders compete in the National Football League (NFL) as a member of the American Football Conference (AFC) West division. The team plays its home games at Allegiant Stadium in Paradise, Nevada, and is headquartered in Henderson, Nevada.

Founded on January 30, 1960, and originally based in Oakland, California, the Oakland Raiders played their first regular season game on September 11, 1960, as a charter member of the American Football League (AFL). They moved to the NFL with the AFL–NFL merger in 1970. The team was almost chosen under the nickname "Señors" when established, as close to the team sporting the "Oakland Señors" team name is the original idea of the orange and black team theme colors, that were discontinued as well. The team departed Oakland to play in Los Angeles from the 1982 season through the 1994 season (as the Los Angeles Raiders) before returning to Oakland at the start of the 1995 season. On March 27, 2017, NFL team owners voted nearly unanimously to approve the Raiders' application to move to the Las Vegas metropolitan area. They played their last game as a California–based franchise on December 29, 2019. On January 22, 2020, the Raiders relocated to the Las Vegas area.

The Raiders' on-field fortunes have varied considerably over the years. The team's first three years of operation were marred by poor performance, financial difficulties, and spotty attendance. In 1963, the Raiders' fortunes improved dramatically with the introduction of head coach (and eventual owner and general manager) Al Davis. Since 1963, the team has won 15 division titles (3 AFL and 12 NFL), one AFL championship (1967), four AFC championships (1976, 1980, 1983, and 2002), and three Super Bowl championships: XI (1976), XV (1980), and XVIII (1983). As of the end of the NFL's 2024 season, the Raiders have an all-time regular season record of 509 wins, 480 losses, and 11 ties; their all-time playoff record currently stands at 25 wins and 20 losses.

Al Davis owned the team from 1972 until his death in 2011. Control of the franchise was then given to Al's son Mark Davis, with Al's wife Carol maintaining ownership. The Raiders are known for their extensive fan base and distinctive team culture. The Raiders have had 17 former players who have been enshrined in the Pro Football Hall of Fame as well as two former coaches and Al Davis. They have previously played at Kezar Stadium and Candlestick Park in San Francisco, Frank Youell Field and the Oakland Coliseum in Oakland, and the Los Angeles Memorial Coliseum in Los Angeles.

In December 2024, the Raiders were among the first teams in NFL history to sell an ownership stake to outside private equity investors. 15% of the franchise was sold, which includes Tom Brady and his business partner, Tom Wagner of Knighthead Capital, gaining a 10% ownership stake.

== History ==
=== Oakland (1960–1981) ===
The city of Oakland, California was awarded the eighth American Football League (AFL) franchise on January 30, 1960. Upon receiving the franchise, a meeting of local civic leaders and businessmen was called, chaired by former U.S. Senator William Fife Knowland of California, editor of the Oakland Tribune. The gathering found a number of businessmen willing to invest in the new team. A limited partnership was formed to own the team headed by managing general partner Y. Charles (Chet) Soda, a local real estate developer, and included general partners Ed McGah, Oakland City Councilman Robert Osborne, F. Wayne Valley, restaurateur Harvey Binns, 1928 Olympic gold medalist Donald Blessing, and contractor Charles Harney, the builder of San Francisco's Candlestick Park, built on a bleak parcel of land he owned; the road leading to the stadium is known as Harney Way.

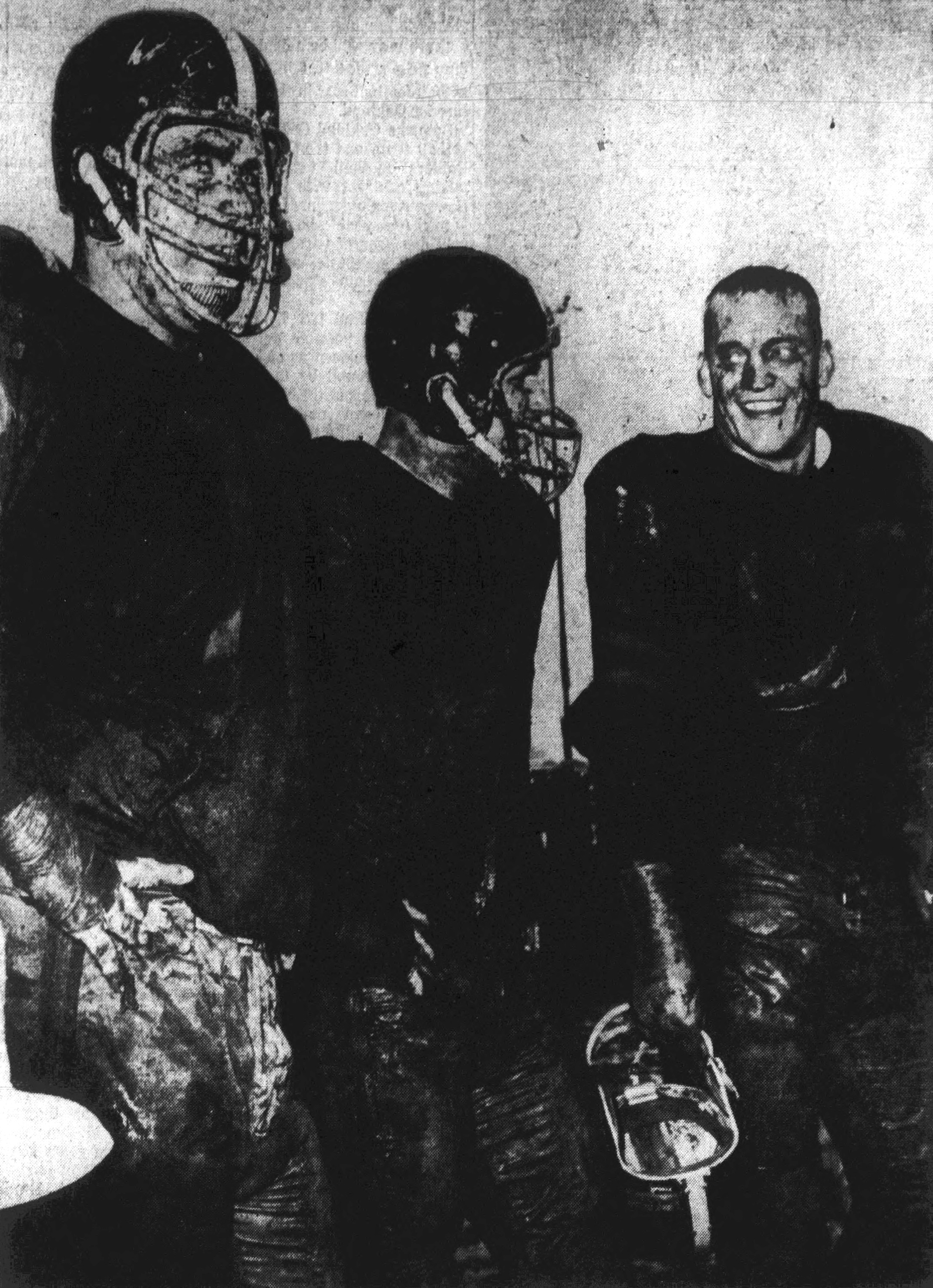
Oakland players Jack Stone (left), Wayne Hawkins (center) and Jim Otto (right) on December 16, 1962, at Frank Youell Field

A "name the team" contest was held by the Oakland Tribune, and the winner was announced April 4, 1960, as the Oakland Señors. After a few days of being the butt of local jokes (and accusations that the contest was fixed, as Soda was fairly well known within the Oakland business community for calling his acquaintances "señor"), the fledgling team (and its owners) changed the team's name nine days later to the Oakland Raiders, which had finished third in the naming contest. The original team colors were black, gold and white. The now-familiar team emblem of a pirate (or "raider") wearing a football helmet was created, reportedly a rendition of actor Randolph Scott.

==== 1960–1966 ====
When the University of California refused to let the Raiders play home games at Memorial Stadium in Berkeley, they chose Kezar Stadium in San Francisco as their home field. The Raiders were allowed to move to Candlestick Park for the final three home games of the 1960 season after gaining the approval of San Francisco's Recreation and Park Commission, marking the first time that professional football would be played at the new stadium. The change of venue, however, failed to attract larger crowds. The Raiders finished their first campaign with a 6–8 record, and lost $500,000, equivalent to $5.44 million in 2025. Desperately in need of money to continue running the team, Valley received a $400,000 loan from Buffalo Bills founder Ralph Wilson, equivalent to $4.35 million in 2025.

After the conclusion of the first season Soda dropped out of the partnership, and on January 17, 1961, Valley, McGah and Osborne bought out the remaining four general partners. Soon after, Valley and McGah purchased Osborne's interest, with Valley named as the managing general partner. Valley threatened to move the Raiders out of the area unless a stadium was built in Oakland, but in 1962 the Raiders moved into 18,000-seat Frank Youell Field (later expanded to 22,000 seats), their first home in Oakland. It was a temporary home for the team while the Oakland–Alameda County Coliseum was under construction. Under Marty Feldman and Red Conkright—the team's second and third head coaches since entering the AFL—the Raiders finished 1–13 in 1962, losing their first 13 games (and making for a 19–game losing streak from 1961 and 1962) before winning the season finale, and attendance remained low.

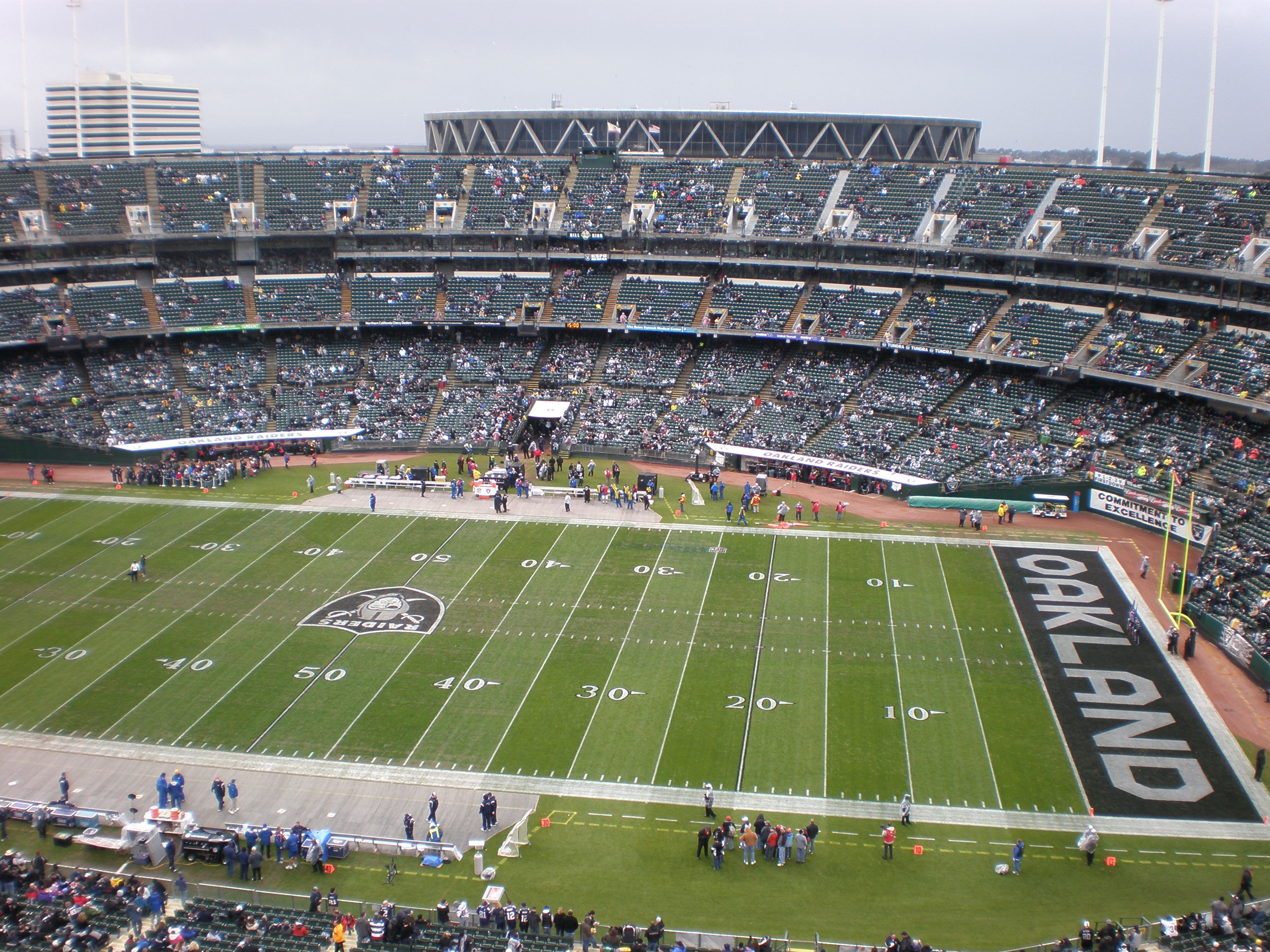
The Raiders played at the Oakland-Alameda County Coliseum in Oakland, California from 1966 to 1981, and later 1995–2019

After the 1962 season, Valley hired Al Davis, a former assistant coach of the San Diego Chargers, as head coach and general manager. At 33, he was the youngest person in over 30 years to hold the position of head coach, and the youngest person ever to hold the position of general manager, in professional football. Davis immediately changed the team colors to silver and black, and began to implement what he termed the "vertical game", an aggressive offensive strategy based on the West Coast offense developed by Chargers head coach Sid Gillman. Under Davis, the Raiders improved to 10–4, and he was named the AFL's Coach of the Year in 1963. Though the team slipped to 5–7–2 in 1964, it rebounded to an 8–5–1 record in 1965. He also initiated the use of team slogans such as "Pride and Poise", "Commitment to Excellence", and "Just Win, Baby"—all of which are registered trademarks.

In April 1966, Davis left the Raiders after being named AFL Commissioner. Two months later, the league announced its merger with the NFL. With the merger, the position of commissioner was no longer needed, and Davis entered into discussions with Valley about returning to the Raiders. On July 25, 1966, Davis returned as part-owner of the team. He purchased a 10 percent interest in the team for $18,000, equivalent to $178,615 in 2025, and became the team's third general partner—the partner in charge of football operations.

==== 1967: AFL champions ====
On the field, the team Davis had assembled and coached steadily improved. With John Rauch (Davis's hand-picked successor) as head coach and quarterback Daryle Lamonica, the Raiders finished the 1967 season with a 13–1 record and won the 1967 AFL Championship, defeating the Houston Oilers 40–7.

The win earned the team a trip to Super Bowl II at the Orange Bowl, where they were defeated 33–14 by Vince Lombardi's Green Bay Packers. Both of Oakland's touchdowns were scored on receptions by wide receiver Bill Miller.

==== 1968–1975 ====
On November 17, 1968, Oakland scored two touchdowns in the final minute to defeat the New York Jets 43–32. However, NBC, decided to break away from its coverage to broadcast the television film Heidi, which caused many viewers to miss the Raiders' comeback. Oakland ended the 1968 season with a 12–2 record; defeating the Chiefs 41–6 in a tiebreaker playoff before losing 27–23 to the Jets in the AFL Championship Game.

In 1969, John Madden became the team's sixth head coach, and under him the Raiders became one of the most successful franchises in the NFL. It was during Madden's tenure that the Raiders forged an image as a team of tough, take-no-prisoners players—such as future Hall of Fame offensive linemen Jim Otto, Gene Upshaw, and Art Shell; linebacker Ted ("the Stork") Hendricks; defensive end Ben Davidson; and defensive backs Jack ("the Assassin") Tatum, George Atkinson, and Skip ("Dr. Death") Thomas—who would occasionally cross the line into dirty play. Those teams also featured future Hall of Fame players in kicker George Blanda, tight end Dave ("the Ghost") Casper, and wide receivers Fred Biletnikoff and Cliff Branch, as well as fiery quarterback Ken ("the Snake") Stabler.

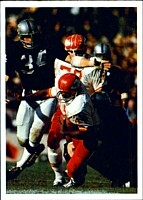
The Raiders won the 1967 AFL Championship Game, but lost the next two against the Jets and the Chiefs (pictured) before the NFL merger.

In 1970, the AFL–NFL merger took place and the Raiders became part of the Western Division of the American Football Conference (AFC) in the newly merged NFL. In 1972, with Wayne Valley out of the country for several weeks attending the Olympic Games in Munich, Davis's attorneys drafted a revised partnership agreement that gave him total control over all of the Raiders' operations. McGah, a supporter of Davis, signed the agreement. Under partnership law, by a 2–1 vote of the general partners, the new agreement was thus ratified. Valley was furious when he discovered this, and immediately filed suit to have the new agreement overturned, but the court sided with Davis and McGah.

Madden's first Raiders squad went 12–1–1 in 1969, but lost to the Kansas City Chiefs in the last-ever AFL Championship Game, 17–7. This would become a frustrating trend during Madden's coaching career. Oakland won seven AFC West division titles and always played to a winning record during his ten seasons as head coach, but they also lost in six AFL / AFC Championship Games. One of the most frustrating playoff defeats came in 1972, when what appeared to be a last-minute AFC Divisional round victory over the Pittsburgh Steelers instead became a part of football lore when Franco Harris' "Immaculate Reception" gave Pittsburgh a 13–7 win.

In 1973, the Raiders reached the AFC Championship with a 9–4–1 record, but lost 27–10 to the Miami Dolphins. In 1974, Oakland had a 12–2 regular season, which included a nine-game winning streak. Quarterback Ken Stabler earned NFL MVP honors. "The Autumn Wind", a poem written by former NFL Films President and co-founder Steve Sabol, became the unofficial team anthem, and was first used for the team's official yearbook film in 1974. It was narrated by John Facenda, and dubbed "The Battle Hymn of the Raider Nation". After knocking the two-time defending Super Bowl champion Dolphins out of the playoffs in dramatic fashion in which running back Clarence Davis caught a late 4th-quarter touchdown amid three Miami defenders ("The Sea of Hands") to win 28–26, the Raiders again lost to the Steelers in the AFC Championship game, 24–13. The Steelers would once more end the Raiders' season one game short of the Super Bowl in the 1975 AFC Championship game, 16–10.

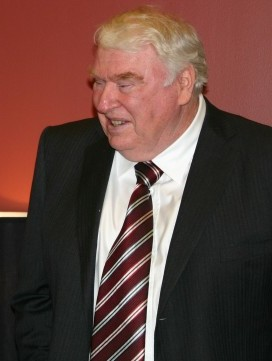
John Madden was the head coach of the Raiders for 10 seasons (1969–1978), leading them to seven AFL / AFC Championship Game appearances, and the franchise's first Super Bowl title in 1976 (XI)

==== 1976: Super Bowl XI champions ====
In 1976, Valley sold his interest in the team, and Davis—who now owned only 25 percent of the Raiders—was firmly in charge. The Raiders beat Pittsburgh in a revenge match on the season opener and continued to cement their reputation for hard, dirty play by knocking receiver Lynn Swann out for two weeks in a helmet-to-helmet collision. Al Davis later tried to sue Steelers coach Chuck Noll for libel after the latter called safety George Atkinson a criminal for the hit.

The Raiders finished 13–1 in the 1976 regular season. Quarterback Ken Stabler completed 66.7% of his passes. Fullback Mark van Eeghen rushed for 1,012 yards. Tight end Dave Casper led the team in receptions (53, including 10 touchdowns), while wide receiver Cliff Branch led in reception yards (1,111), touchdowns (12), and yards per reception (24.2). Oakland escaped the first round of the AFC playoffs with a dramatic and controversial 24–21 victory over the New England Patriots. New England's Ray Hamilton was tagged for roughing the passer in the fourth quarter, turning an incomplete pass on 3rd and 18 into a first down, and the Raiders went on to score on Ken Stabler's 1-yard touchdown run with 14 seconds left in the contest.

In their third straight encounter with Pittsburgh in the 1976 AFC Championship Game, Madden's Raiders finally defeated their nemesis 24–7 to reach Super Bowl XI at the Rose Bowl. Oakland's opponent was the Minnesota Vikings, a team that had lost three previous Super Bowls. The Raiders led 16–0 at halftime. By the end, forcing their opponent into multiple turnovers, they won 32–14 for their first Super Bowl championship. Hall of Fame wide receiver Fred Biletnikoff was voted Super Bowl MVP, catching four passes for 79 yards and setting up three Oakland scores. Another key play was a 75-yard interception return for a touchdown by Hall of Fame cornerback Willie Brown in the fourth quarter, which put the game completely out of reach.

==== 1977–1979 ====
The following season saw the Raiders defeating the Baltimore Colts in the AFC playoffs 37–31 (2 OT) when Errol Mann tied the game with a late field goal, set up by a pass to tight end Dave Casper, a play known as the "Ghost to the Post". In the second overtime, Casper caught a touchdown pass for the victory. The following week, Oakland fell to the Denver Broncos 20–17 in the 1977 AFC Championship Game.

With 10 seconds left during a September 10, 1978, matchup with the San Diego Chargers, quarterback Ken Stabler intentionally tossed the ball forward by under-handing it; a teammate dove for the ball and shoveled it closer to the end zone. Tight end Dave Casper then kicked the ball to himself in the end zone for a touchdown and a 21–20 Raiders' win. The play, which became known as the "Holy Roller," led to an NFL rule change prohibiting any player besides the fumbler, from the two-minute warning onward, from advancing the ball.

After ten consecutive winning seasons and one Super Bowl championship, John Madden left the Raiders (and coaching) in 1979 to pursue a career as a television football commentator. His replacement was former Raiders quarterback Tom Flores, the first Hispanic head coach in NFL history.

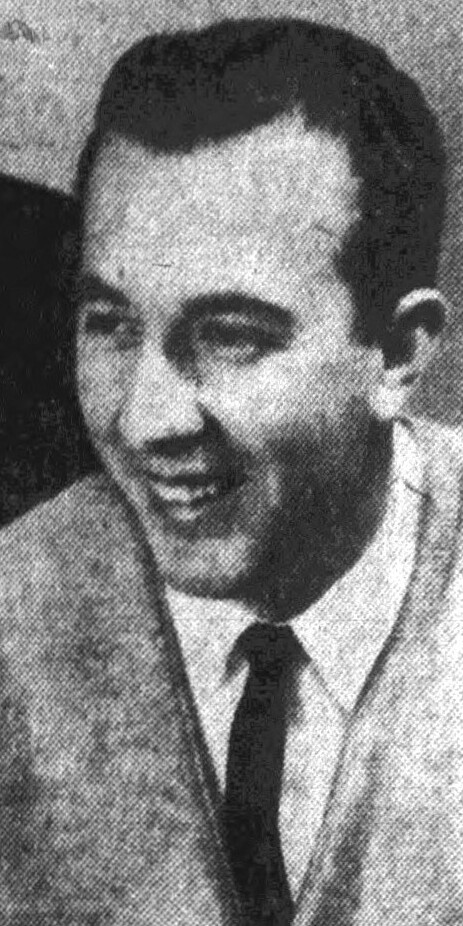
Tom Flores was the Raiders head coach from 1979 to 1987, winning two Super Bowls: 1980 (XV) and 1983 (XVIII)

==== 1980: Super Bowl XV champions ====
In the midst of the turmoil of Al Davis' attempts to move the team to Los Angeles in 1980, Flores looked to lead the Raiders to their third Super Bowl by finishing the 1980 season 11–5 and earning a wild card berth. Quarterback Jim Plunkett revitalized his career, taking over in week five when starter Dan Pastorini was lost for the season to a broken leg. New acquisition, wide receiver Bob Chandler, contributed by leading the team in receptions (49) and touchdowns (10). The Raiders spent most of the year as a mistake-prone offensive mess. Oakland turned it over 44 times and finished 16th in total yards. Oakland's defense, on the other hand, led the NFL in forced turnovers (52) and interceptions (35). That same season, defensive back Lester Hayes had a standout performance, recording 18 interceptions and 2 defensive touchdowns in 19 games played (including postseason).

After playoff victories against the Houston Oilers 27–7, Cleveland Browns 14–12 (see "Red Right 88"), and San Diego Chargers 34–27 in the 1980 AFC Championship Game, the Raiders went to Super Bowl XV at the Louisiana Superdome. Oakland clinched their second NFL championship in five years with a 27–10 win over the favored Philadelphia Eagles. With the victory, the Raiders became the first ever wild card team to win a Super Bowl. Two Super Bowl records of note occurred in this game: 1) Kenny King's 80-yard, first-quarter, catch-and-run reception from Jim Plunkett remained the longest touchdown pass play for the next 16 years; and 2) Rod Martin's three interceptions of Eagles' quarterback Ron Jaworski still stands today as a Super Bowl record. Reflecting on the last ten years during the post-game awards ceremony, Al Davis stated "...this was our finest hour, this was the finest hour in the history of the Oakland Raiders. To Tom Flores, the coaches, and the athletes: you were magnificent out there, you really were."

=== Los Angeles (1982–1994) ===
Before the 1980 season, Al Davis attempted unsuccessfully to add luxury boxes to the Oakland–Alameda County Coliseum. On March 1, he signed a memorandum of agreement to move the Raiders from Oakland to Los Angeles. The move, which required three-fourths approval by league owners, was defeated 22–0 (with five owners abstaining). When Davis tried to move the team anyway, he was blocked by an injunction. In response, the Raiders became a partner in an antitrust lawsuit filed by the Los Angeles Memorial Coliseum (which had recently lost the Los Angeles Rams to Anaheim) and filed an antitrust lawsuit of their own. After the first case was declared a mistrial, in May 1982 a second jury found in favor of Davis and the Los Angeles Coliseum, clearing the way for the move. With the ruling, the Raiders finally moved to Los Angeles for the 1982 season to play their home games at the Los Angeles Coliseum. "Sure, I expected the Oakland fans to get angry at me," Davis said. "But I don't remember any of them parading on the Oakland Coliseum, saying 'Give him what he wants.' In their mind, it's their team. In my mind, it's not."

The Los Angeles teams of the 1980s featured three future Hall of Famers—running back Marcus Allen, defensive lineman Howie Long, and cornerback Mike Haynes—and multisport sensation Bo Jackson, who excelled in both Major League Baseball (MLB) and the NFL as a running back.

In the strike-shortened 1982 season, the team finished first in the AFC with an 8–1 record. They defeated the Cleveland Browns in the first round of the AFC playoffs before losing to the New York Jets in the second round.

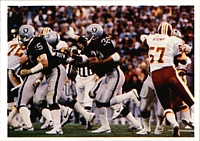
Marcus Allen (center) led the Raiders to a championship in Super Bowl XVIII and earned MVP honors as he rushed for a record of 191 yards, including a memorable 74-yard touchdown run.

==== 1983: Super Bowl XVIII champions ====
In 1983, the Raiders compiled a 12–4 record and a first-place finish in the AFC West. In the playoffs, they convincingly defeated the Pittsburgh Steelers 38–10 in the Divisional Round, and Seattle Seahawks 30–14 in the 1983 AFC Championship Game to advance to Super Bowl XVIII against the Washington Redskins at Tampa Stadium. With seven seconds remaining in the first half, linebacker Jack Squirek intercepted a Joe Theismann swing pass at the Washington five-yard line and scored, sending the Raiders to a 21–3 halftime lead. Los Angeles sealed the game when Hall of Fame running back Marcus Allen reversed his route on a Super Bowl record run that turned into a 74-yard touchdown. The Raiders went on to a 38–9 victory and their third NFL championship. Allen, who was named Super Bowl MVP, set a Super Bowl record for most rushing yards (191) and combined yards (209).

==== 1984–1994 ====
The Raiders had another successful regular season in 1984, finishing 11–5, but a three-game losing streak in late October and early November forced them to enter the playoffs as the second wild card team. They were defeated by the Seahawks in the Wild Card Playoffs, 13–7. The 1985 campaign saw 12 wins and another division title, but the first-seeded Raiders suffered a humiliating 27–20 defeat at the hands of the New England Patriots in the Divisional Playoffs.

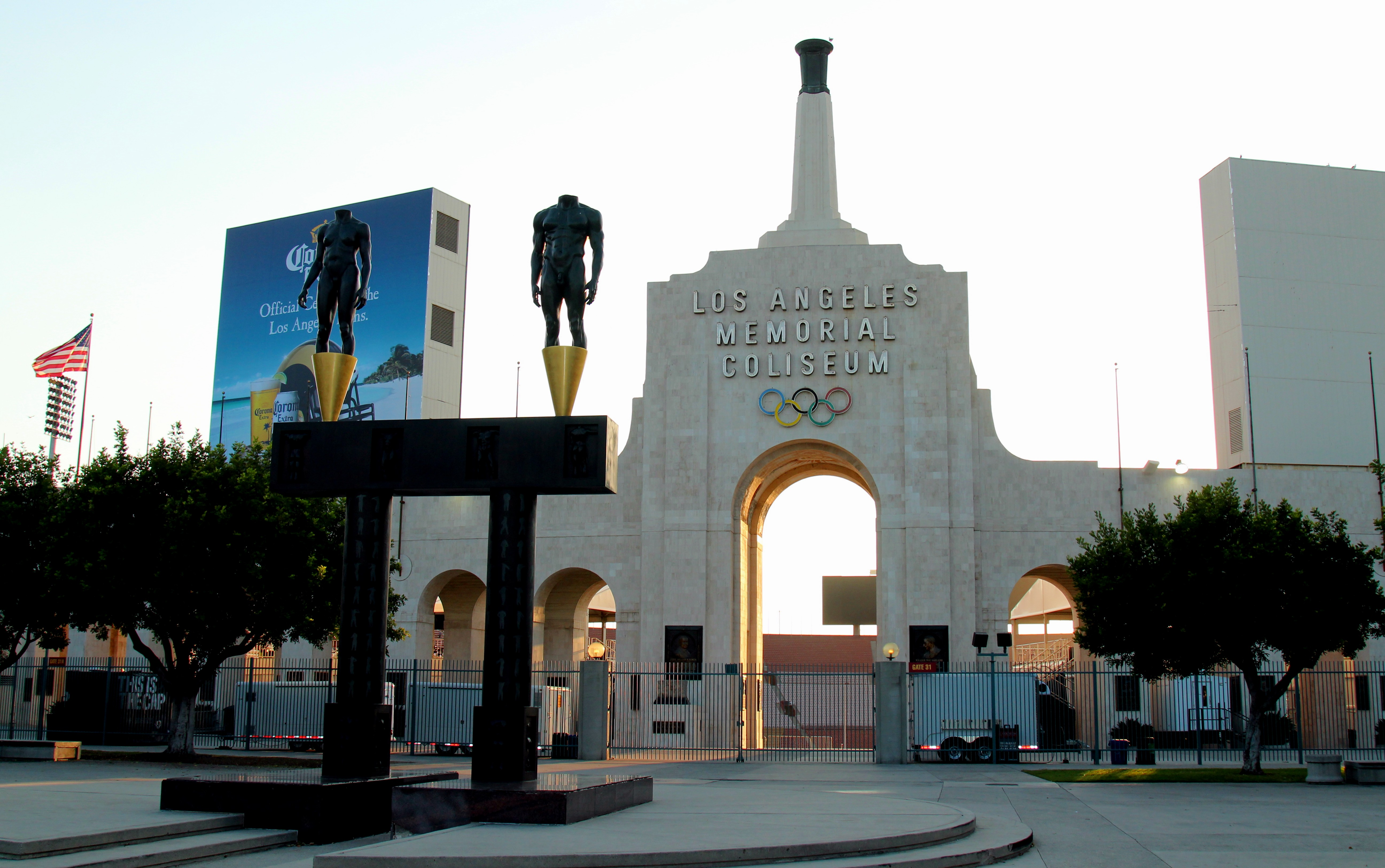
The Raiders played at the Los Angeles Memorial Coliseum from 1982 to 1994

The Raiders' fortunes declined after the loss to the Patriots in the 1985 playoffs. From 1986 through 1989, they finished no better than 8–8 and posted consecutive losing seasons for the first time since 1961–62. Also, 1986 saw Al Davis get into a widely publicized argument with running back Marcus Allen, whom he accused of faking injuries. The feud continued into 1987, with Davis retaliating by signing Bo Jackson to take Allen's place. However, Jackson was also a left fielder for Major League Baseball's Kansas City Royals, and could not play full-time until the baseball season ended in October. Even worse, another strike cost the NFL one game and prompted them to use substitute players. The Raiders fill-ins achieved a 1–2 record before the regular roster returned. After a weak 5–10 finish, head coach Tom Flores moved to the front office and was replaced by Denver Broncos offensive coordinator Mike Shanahan. Shanahan coached the team to a 7–9 mark in 1988, and Allen and Jackson continued to trade places as the starting running back. Low game attendance and fan apathy were evident by this point, and in the summer of 1989, rumors of a Raiders return to Oakland intensified when a preseason game against the Houston Oilers was scheduled at Oakland Coliseum.

As early as 1986, Davis began to seek a new, more modern stadium away from the Los Angeles Memorial Coliseum and the dangerous neighborhood that surrounded it at the time (which caused the NFL to schedule the Raiders' Monday Night Football appearances as away games). In addition to the team having to share the venue with the USC Trojans, the Coliseum was aging and still lacked the luxury suites and other amenities that Davis was promised when he moved the Raiders to Los Angeles. Finally, the Coliseum had 100,000 seats and was rarely able to fill all of them, and so most Raiders home games were blacked out on television. In August 1987, it was announced that the city of Irwindale, California paid Davis $10 million as a good-faith deposit for a prospective stadium site, though Davis later kept the deposit despite the bid being abandoned by the team. During this time Davis also almost moved the team to Sacramento in a deal that would have included Davis becoming the managing partner of the Sacramento Kings.

Negotiations between Davis and Oakland commenced in January 1989, and on March 11, 1990, Davis announced his intention to bring the Raiders back to Oakland. By September 1990, however, numerous delays had prevented the completion. On September 11, Davis announced a new deal to stay in Los Angeles, leading many fans in Oakland to burn Raiders paraphernalia in disgust.

After starting the 1989 season with a 1–3 record, Shanahan was fired by Davis, which began a long-standing feud between the two. He was replaced by former Raiders offensive lineman Art Shell, who had been voted into the Pro Football Hall of Fame earlier in the year. With the hiring, Shell became the first African American head coach in the modern NFL era, but the team still finished a middling 8–8. In 1990, Shell led Los Angeles to a 12–4 record. They beat the Cincinnati Bengals in the divisional round of the AFC playoffs, but Bo Jackson had his left femur ripped from the socket after a tackle. Without him, the Raiders were crushed in the AFC Championship by the Buffalo Bills 51–3. Jackson was forced to quit football as a result, although surgery allowed him to continue playing baseball until he retired in 1994.

The team's fortunes faded after the loss. They made two other playoff appearances during the 1990s, and finished higher than third place only three times. In 1991, Los Angeles got into the postseason as a wild card after a 9–7 regular season, but fell to Kansas City. 1992 saw the Raiders drop to 7–9. This period was marked by the injury of Jackson in 1991, the failure of troubled quarterback Todd Marinovich, the acrimonious departure of Marcus Allen in 1993, and the retirement of Hall of Fame defensive end Howie Long after the 1993 season, where the Raiders went 10–6 and lost to Buffalo in the divisional round of the playoffs. The Todd Marinovich fiasco overshadowed the Raiders' 1991 and 1992 efforts. Marinovich was groomed from childhood to play football; his strict upbringing led to him being called "Robo QB" in the sports press. He attended USC and was the 24th overall pick in the 1991 draft. However, he struggled on field and was cut after the 1992 season due to repeated substance abuse problems.

=== Oakland (1995–2019) ===
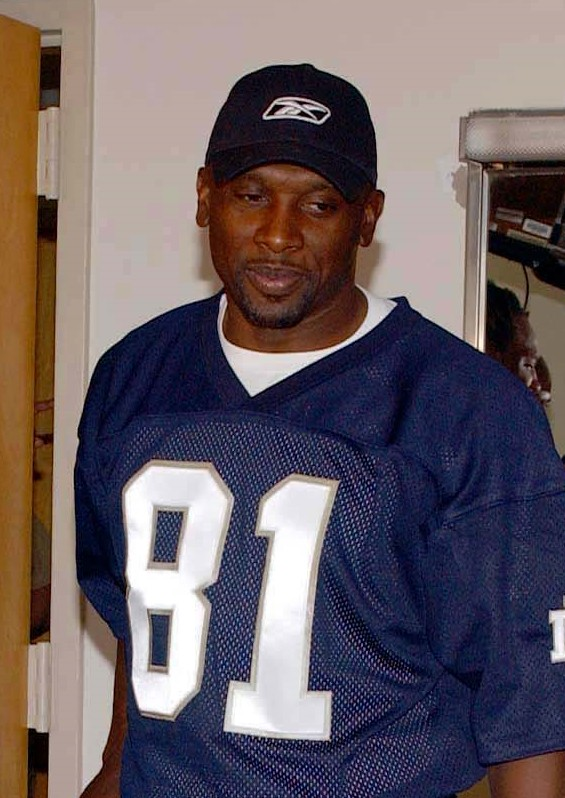
Hall of Fame WR Tim Brown played for the Los Angeles / Oakland Raiders from 1988 to 2003

On June 23, 1995, Davis signed a letter of intent to move the Raiders back to Oakland. The move was approved by the Alameda County Board of Supervisors the next month, as well as by the NFL. The move was greeted with much fanfare, and under new head coach Mike White the 1995 season started off well for the team. Oakland started 8–2, but injuries to starting quarterback Jeff Hostetler contributed to a six-game losing streak to end the season, and the Raiders failed to qualify for the playoffs for a second consecutive season. As part of the agreement to bring the Raiders back to Oakland the city agreed that they would increase the capacity of the Coliseum. The result was a structure of 20,000 capacity seating that became known as Mount Davis after Davis. The structure was completed in time for the 1996 season.

==== 1998–2001: Gruden era ====
After two more unsuccessful seasons (7–9 in 1996 and 4–12 in 1997) under White and his successor, Joe Bugel, Davis selected a new head coach from outside the Raiders organization for only the second time when he hired Philadelphia Eagles offensive coordinator Jon Gruden, who previously worked for the 49ers and Packers under head coach Mike Holmgren. Under Gruden, the Raiders posted consecutive 8–8 seasons in 1998 and 1999, and climbed out of last place in the AFC West. Oakland finished 12–4 in the 2000 season, the team's most successful in a decade. Led by veteran quarterback Rich Gannon, Oakland won their first division title since 1990, and advanced to the AFC Championship, where they lost 16–3 to the eventual Super Bowl champion Baltimore Ravens.

The Raiders acquired all-time leading wide receiver Jerry Rice before the 2001 season. They finished 10–6 and won a second straight AFC West title but lost their divisional-round playoff game to the eventual Super Bowl champion New England Patriots, in a controversial game that became known as the "Tuck Rule Game". The game was played in a heavy snowstorm, and late in the fourth quarter an apparent fumble by Patriots quarterback Tom Brady was recovered by Raiders linebacker Greg Biekert. The recovery would have led to a Raiders victory; however, the play was reviewed and determined to be an incomplete pass (it was ruled that Brady had pump faked and then "tucked" the ball into his body, which, by rule, cannot result in a fumble – though this explanation was not given on the field, but after the NFL season had ended). The Patriots retained possession of the ball, and drove for a game-tying field goal. The game went into overtime and the Patriots won, 16–13.

==== 2002–2003: Callahan era and Super Bowl XXXVII appearance ====
Shortly after the 2001 season, the Raiders made an unusual move that involved releasing Gruden from his contract and allowing the Tampa Bay Buccaneers to sign him. In return, the Raiders received cash and future draft picks from the Buccaneers. The sudden move came after months of speculation in the media that Davis and Gruden had fallen out with each other both personally and professionally. Bill Callahan, who served as the team's offensive coordinator and offensive line coach during Gruden's tenure, was named head coach.

Under Callahan, the Raiders finished the 2002 season 11–5, won their third straight division title, and clinched the top seed in the playoffs. Quarterback Rich Gannon was named NFL MVP after passing for a league-high 4,689 yards. In the third quarter of Oakland's 26–20 win on Monday Night Football over the Jets, Hall of Fame wide receiver Tim Brown became the third player in NFL history with 1,000 career catches. Multi-talented running back Charlie Garner was the team's leading rusher with 962 yards and seven touchdowns, while also leading all NFL running backs in receiving with 91 receptions for 941 yards and another four touchdowns. After beating the New York Jets and Tennessee Titans by large margins (combined score of 71–34) in the AFC playoffs, the Raiders made their fifth Super Bowl appearance in Super Bowl XXXVII at San Diego Stadium. Their opponent was the Tampa Bay Buccaneers, coached by Gruden. The Raiders, who had not made significant changes to Gruden's offensive schemes, were intercepted five times by the Buccaneers en route to a 48–21 blowout. Some Tampa Bay players claimed that Gruden had given them so much information on Oakland's offense, they knew exactly what plays were being called.

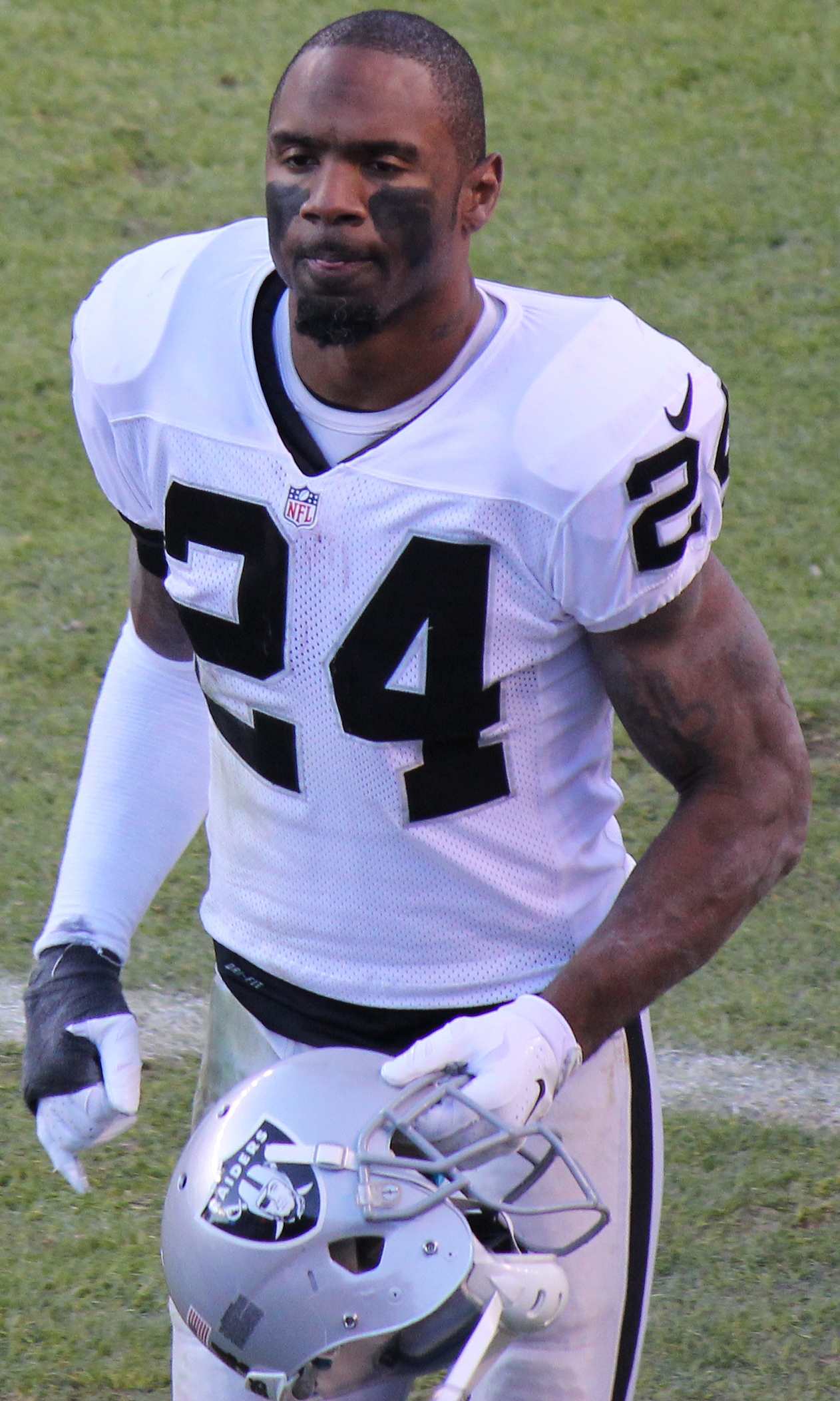
Hall of Fame defensive back Charles Woodson played in Oakland from 1998 to 2005; 2013 to 2015

Callahan's second season as head coach was considerably less successful. Oakland finished 4–12, their worst showing since 1997. After a late-season loss to the Denver Broncos, a visibly frustrated Callahan exclaimed, "We've got to be the dumbest team in America in terms of playing the game." At the end of the 2003 regular season, Callahan was fired and replaced by former Washington Redskins head coach Norv Turner.

==== 2004–2009: Coaching carousel and consecutive eleven-loss seasons ====
The team's fortunes did not improve in Turner's first year. Oakland finished the 2004 season 5–11, with only one divisional win (a one-point victory over the Broncos in Denver). During a Week 3 victory against the Buccaneers, Rich Gannon suffered a neck injury that ended his season and eventually his career; he never returned to the team and retired before the 2005 season. Kerry Collins, who led the New York Giants to an appearance in Super Bowl XXXV and signed with Oakland after the 2003 season, became the team's starting quarterback.

In an effort to bolster their offense, in early 2005 the Raiders acquired Pro Bowl wide receiver Randy Moss via trade with the Minnesota Vikings, and signed free agent running back Lamont Jordan of the New York Jets. After a 4–12 season and a second consecutive last-place finish, Turner was fired as head coach. On February 11, 2006, the team announced the return of Art Shell as head coach. In announcing the move, Al Davis said that firing Shell in 1995 had been a mistake.

Under Shell, the Raiders lost their first five games in 2006 en route to a 2–14 finish, the team's worst record since 1962. Oakland's offense struggled greatly, scoring just 168 points (fewest in franchise history) and allowing a league-high 72 sacks. Wide receiver Jerry Porter was benched by Shell for most of the season in what many viewed as a personal, rather than football-related, decision. The Raiders also earned the right to the first overall pick in the 2007 NFL draft for the first time since 1962, by virtue of having the league's worst record.

One season into his second run as head coach, Shell was fired on January 4, 2007. On January 22, the team announced the hiring of 31-year-old USC offensive coordinator Lane Kiffin, the youngest coach in franchise history and the youngest coach in the NFL. In the 2007 NFL Draft, the Raiders selected LSU quarterback JaMarcus Russell with the #1 overall pick. Kiffin coached the Raiders to a 4–12 record in the 2007 season. After a 1–3 start to 2008 and months of speculation and rumors, Al Davis fired Kiffin on September 30, 2008. Tom Cable was named as his interim replacement, and officially signed as the 17th head coach of the Oakland Raiders on February 3, 2009.

At the end of their 2009 campaign, the Raiders became the first team in NFL history to lose at least 11 games in seven straight seasons.

==== 2010–2011: Al Davis' final years ====
In 2010, the Raiders became the first team in NFL history to go undefeated against their division yet miss the playoffs (6–0 in the AFC West, 8–8 overall, 3 games behind the Jets for the second Wild Card entry). On January 4, 2011, owner Al Davis informed head coach Tom Cable that his contract would not be renewed, ending his tenure with the organization.

Al Davis, who was now past his 80th birthday and in increasingly poor health, refused to hire a general manager or relinquish his absolute control of the team's on-field activities and he continued to make all major decisions regarding draft picks, trades, or signings himself. Davis was criticized for clinging to outdated player evaluation philosophies, sometimes overlooking talented players who didn't fit his traditional mold. His teams in the 2000s often struggled to navigate the complexities of the NFL's salary cap, leading to roster instability and a lack of competitive depth. Critics argued that Davis didn't prioritize investing in high-quality training facilities, which could have helped the Raiders attract and develop talent.

On January 17, 2011, it was announced that offensive coordinator Hue Jackson was going to be the next Raiders head coach. A press conference was held on January 18, 2011, to formally introduce Jackson as the next Raiders head coach, the fifth in just seven years. Following Davis's death during the 2011 season, new owners Carol and Mark Davis decided to take the franchise in a drastically different direction by hiring a general manager. In Week 17, the Raiders played the San Diego Chargers, hoping to go to the playoffs for the first time since 2002, the game ended with a 38–26 loss. Their season ended with another disappointing 8–8 record.

==== 2012–2017: Dennis Allen and Jack Del Rio ====
The Raiders named Reggie McKenzie as the team's first general manager since Al Davis on January 6, 2012. At the time of Al Davis's death, the Oakland Raiders faced a challenging situation characterized by a lack of salary cap space, and a history of seemingly misspent first-round draft picks on players like Robert Gallery, Darrius Heyward-Bey, and JaMarcus Russell. This led to a struggling franchise with a roster of aging players and a perceived lack of future talent. Surveys of players across the league consistently showed that the Raiders had become one of the least desirable teams to play for. In addition, with the Miami Marlins obtaining their own ballpark in 2012, the Raiders became the last team in the NFL to still share a stadium with a Major League Baseball (MLB) franchise. The end of the Oakland Athletics season correlated with the beginning of the NFL season, which forced the Raiders to play certain games on infield dirt.

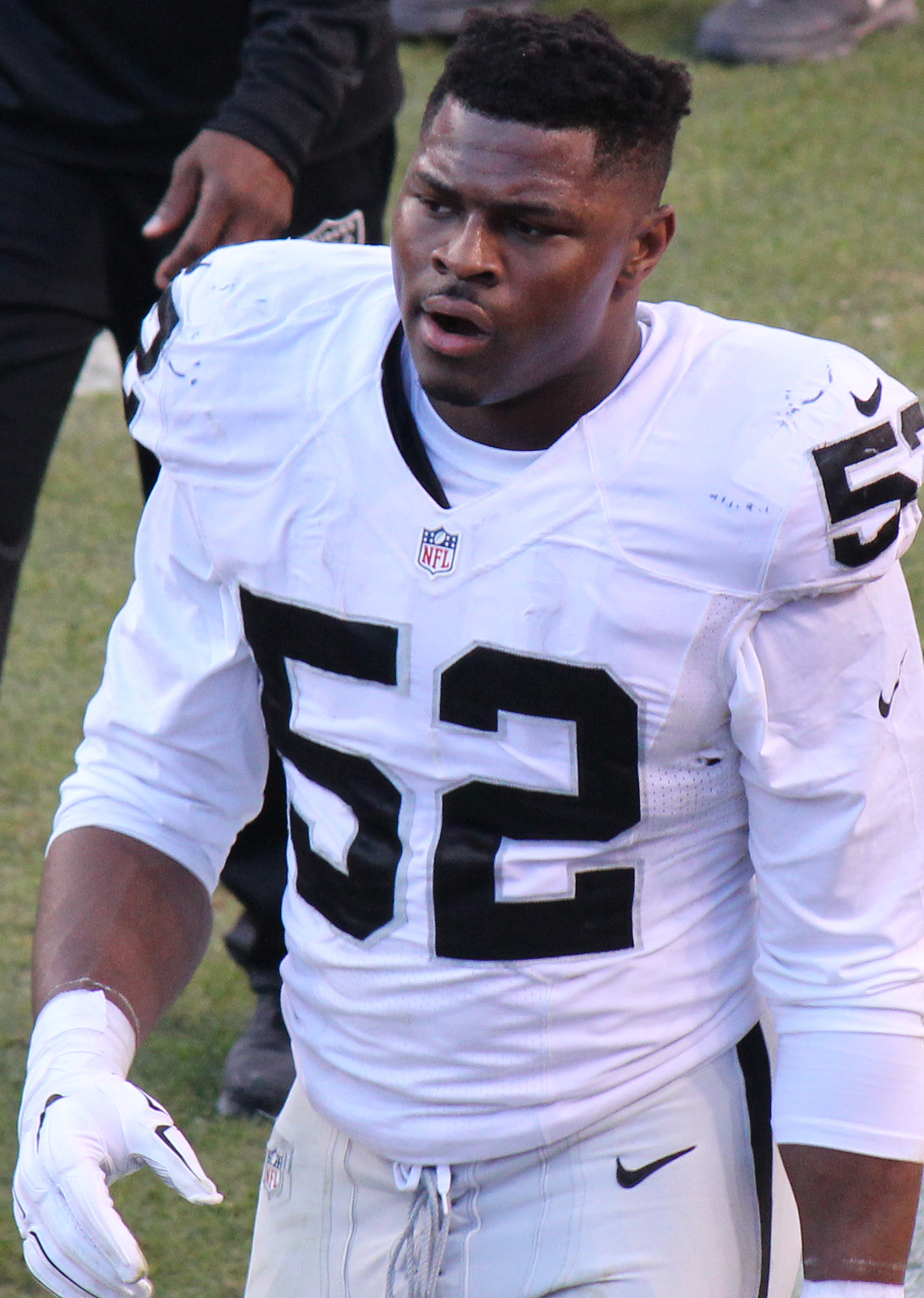
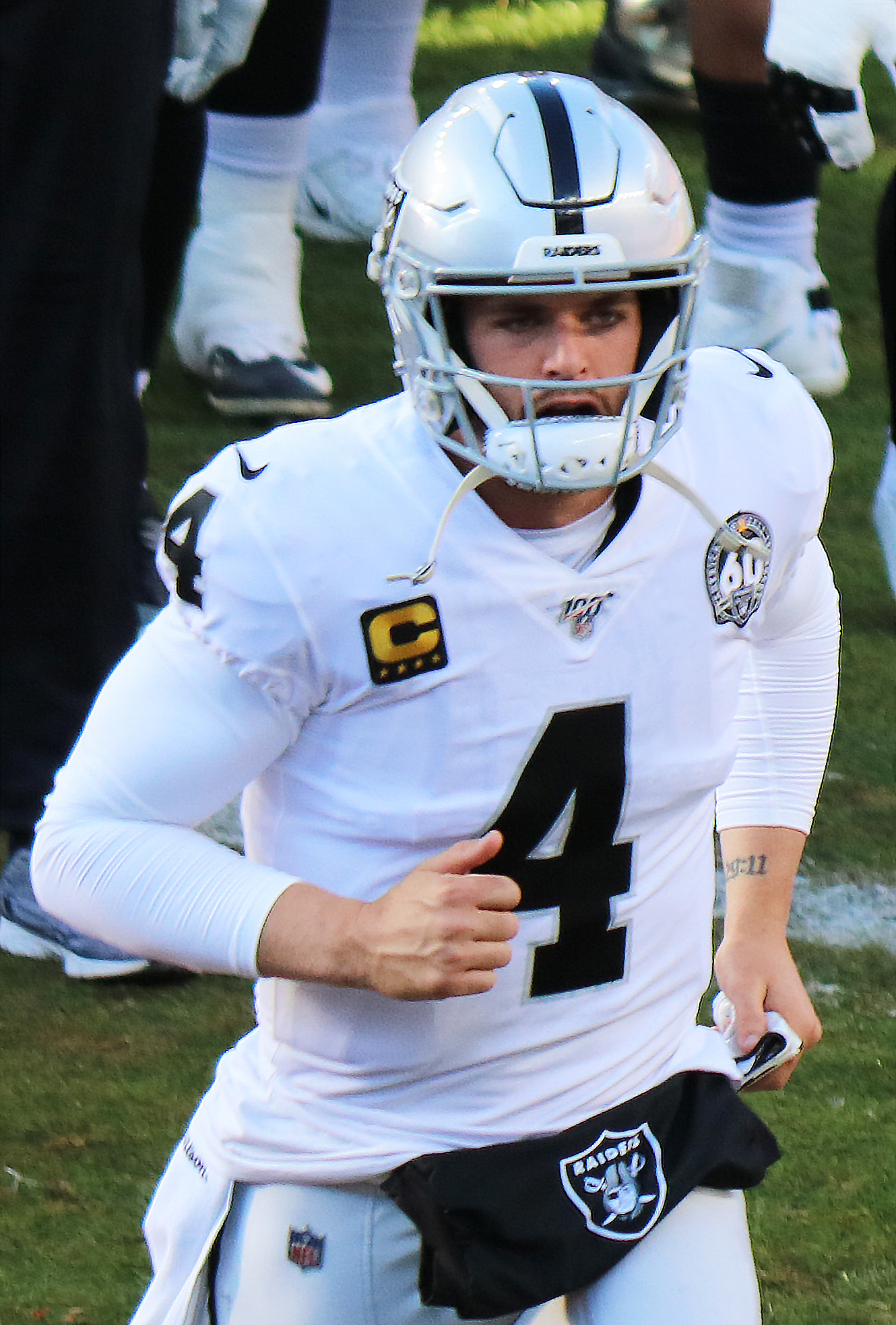
2014 draft picks Khalil Mack (top) and Derek Carr (bottom) helped lead the Raiders back to respectability for a few years.

In the 2014 NFL draft, the Raiders selected linebacker Khalil Mack in the first round and quarterback Derek Carr in the second round hoping each would anchor their side of the ball. Carr was given control early as he was chosen as the starter for the opener of the 2014 season. After an 0–4 start to the 2014 season, and an 8–28 overall record as head coach, Allen was fired. Offensive line coach Tony Sparano was named interim head coach on September 30. The Raiders finished the 2014 season with a record of 3–13. Carr started all 16 games for the Raiders, the first Raider since 2002 to do so. First-round pick Mack finished third in Defensive Rookie of the Year voting.

On January 14, 2015, Jack Del Rio, the then-Denver Broncos defensive coordinator and former Jacksonville Jaguars head coach, was hired by the Oakland Raiders to be their new head coach. The Raiders showed great improvement in Del Rio's first season, improving upon their three-win 2014 season, going 7–9 in the 2015 season. Rookie wide receiver Amari Cooper fulfilled almost all expectations, and Derek Carr continued his improvement at quarterback. Cooper, Mack, Murray, and Carr were selected to participate in the Pro Bowl. Defensive end Khalil Mack was the first player ever to be selected as an AP 2015 All-Pro Team at two positions in the same year.

In 2016, the team finished 12–4, clinching their first postseason berth since 2002 with strong play on both offense and defense, but lost Derek Carr and backup Matt McGloin to season-ending injuries to close out the year. The Raiders lost to the Houston Texans 27–14 in the AFC Wild Card.

Before the 2017 season, the Raiders signed quarterback Derek Carr to a then-NFL record contract extension of five years, $125 million. Following their first trip to the playoffs in 14 years, the Raiders expected bigger things in 2017, with a return to the playoffs seeming likely. The Raiders defense struggled mightily on the year under Ken Norton Jr., but later improved with John Pagano as the defensive coordinator and the Raiders offense could not return to its previous year's form under first-year offensive coordinator Todd Downing. After winning the first two games of the season, the Raiders lost four straight and six of their next eight leaving them two games below .500 with six games remaining. They would win their next two games, but lose their final four games, ending the season a disappointing 6–10. On December 31, 2017, following a loss to the Chargers in Week 17, head coach Del Rio was fired by Mark Davis after being granted a four-year contract extension before the season.

==== 2018–2019: Return of Jon Gruden and the end of the Oakland Raiders ====
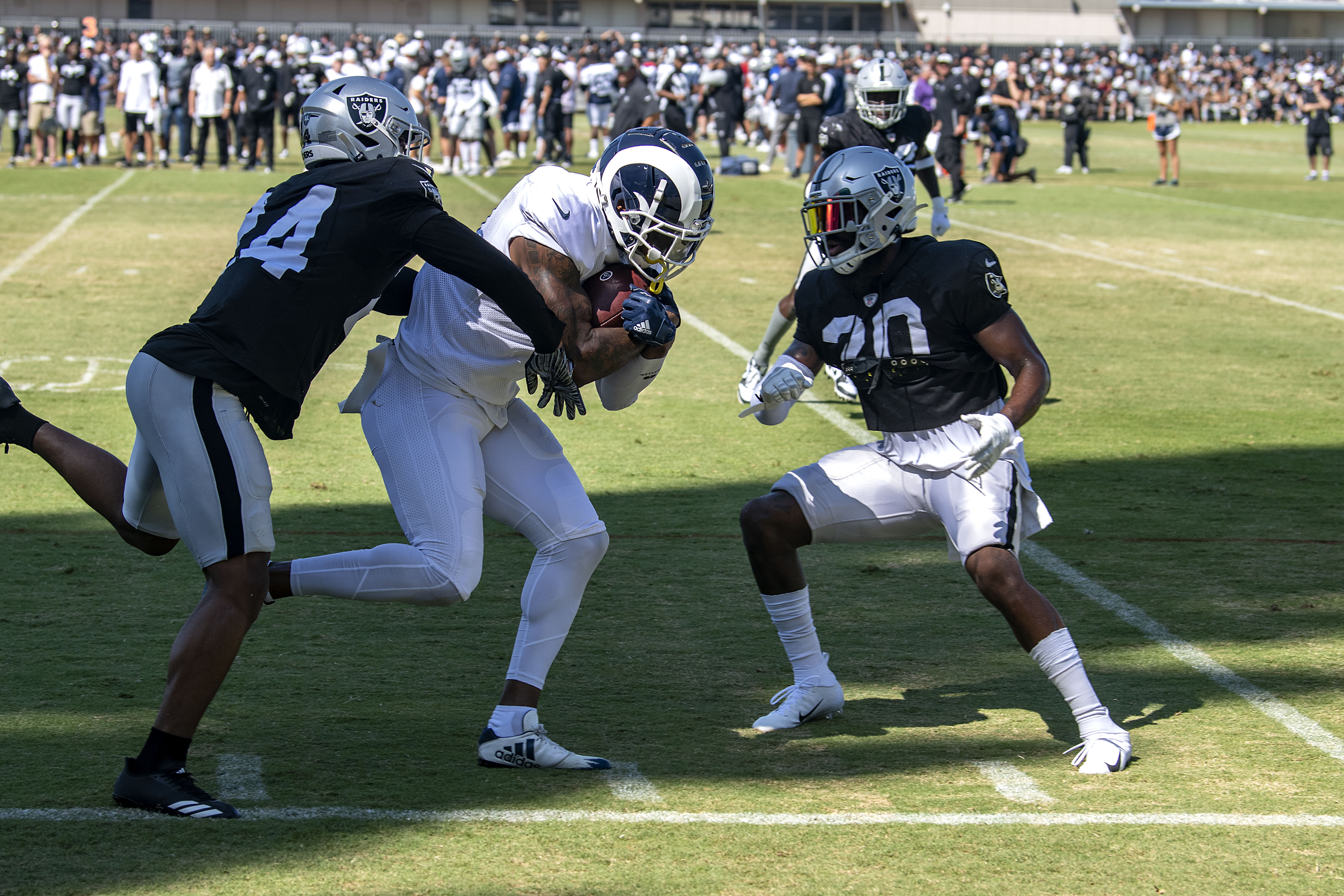
Oakland Raiders defensive backs pursuing a Los Angeles Rams receiver in a joint practice during the 2019 training camp.

On January 6, 2018, the team announced the return of Jon Gruden as head coach. Gruden returned to the Raiders and coaching after a nine-year stint with ESPN serving as analyst for Monday Night Football. Davis, who had reportedly been wanting to hire Gruden for six years, gave Gruden a 10-year contract worth an estimated $100 million. One of the first major moves of the second Gruden era was a blockbuster trade that sent Khalil Mack who was holding out for a new contract to the Chicago Bears for two first-round draft picks, and later sent Amari Cooper to the Dallas Cowboys for another first-round draft pick.

During the 2018 season the Raiders fired general manager Reggie McKenzie, replacing him with NFL Network's draft expert Mike Mayock for the 2019 season. The Raiders finished 4–12 and in last place in the AFC West for the first time since 2014. The next year, in what would be the last season of the team's second tenure in Oakland, the team posted a three-game turnaround with a 7–9 record. Wide receiver Antonio Brown was released before the start of the regular season due to conduct detrimental to the team, including a heated argument with general manager Mayock.

December 29, 2019 would be the Raiders' final game as a California–based franchise, losing 16–15 to the Denver Broncos, eliminating them from playoff contention.

=== Las Vegas (2020–present) ===
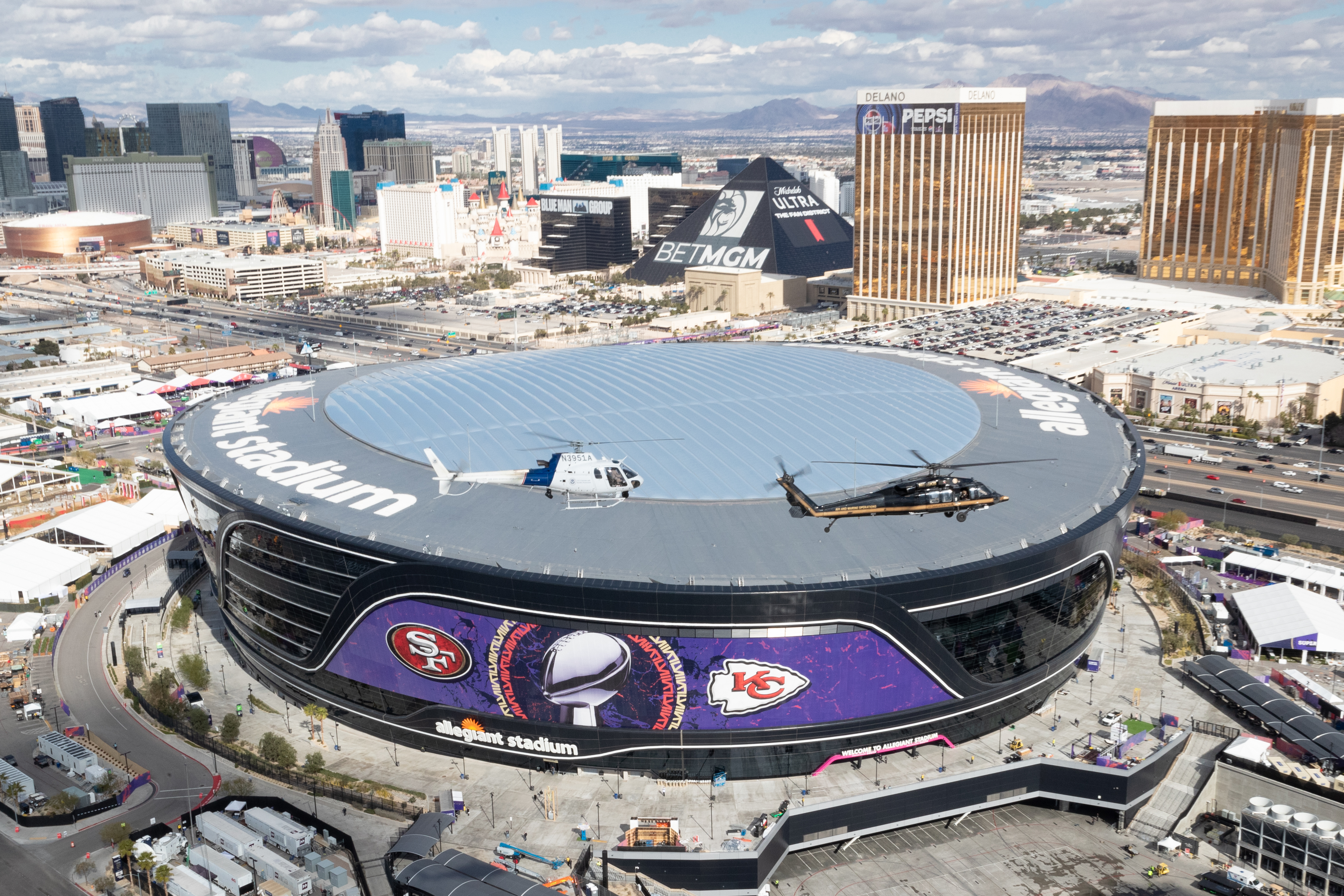
The Raiders have played at Allegiant Stadium on the Las Vegas Strip in Paradise, Nevada since 2020

==== Relocation to Las Vegas ====
The day following the conclusion of the 2015 regular season, the Raiders, St. Louis Rams, and San Diego Chargers all filed to move to Los Angeles. On January 12, 2016, the NFL owners voted 30–2 to allow the Rams to return to Los Angeles and approved a stadium project in Inglewood proposed by Rams owner Stan Kroenke over a competing project in Carson that the Chargers and Raiders had jointly proposed. The Chargers were given a one-year approval to move as well, conditioned on negotiating a lease agreement with the Rams or an agreement to partner with the Rams on the new stadium construction. The Raiders were given conditional permission to move if the Chargers were to decline their option first.

As part of the Rams' decision to move, the NFL offered to provide both the Chargers and Raiders $100 million each if they could work out new stadiums in their home markets. The Chargers eventually announced on January 12, 2017, that they would exercise their option to move to Los Angeles after the failure of a November 2016 ballot initiative to fund a new stadium in San Diego. In an official statement on the Rams decision, the Raiders offered they would "now turn our attention to exploring all options to find a permanent stadium solution." Las Vegas and San Antonio were heavily rumored as possible destinations. By mid-February 2016, the team had worked out a one-year lease agreement with the City of Oakland to play at O.co Coliseum with the option for a second one-year lease.

In late January 2016 billionaire Sheldon Adelson, president and CEO of the Las Vegas Sands Corporation casino empire, proposed a new domed stadium (Allegiant Stadium) in Las Vegas to house the University of Nevada, Las Vegas football team and a possible NFL team. Adelson quickly reached out to the Raiders to discuss working together on the new stadium. In April 2016, without promising the team would move, Raiders owner Mark Davis met with the Southern Nevada Tourism Infrastructure Committee and pledged $500 million toward Adelson's stadium if public officials agreed to contribute to the stadium.

A group of investors led by former NFL stars Ronnie Lott and Rodney Peete proposed a new stadium to the City of Oakland in June 2016 as a way to keep the Raiders in the Bay Area. Nevada's legislature approved a $750 million public subsidy for the proposed domed Las Vegas stadium in October 2016. Davis informed his fellow NFL owners that he intended to file for a move to Las Vegas following the end of the season.

After over 10 years of failure to secure a new stadium in Oakland to replace the decaying Coliseum—whose problems included sewage backups and flooding—and after missing out on Los Angeles, on March 27, 2017, the NFL granted the team permission to move to Las Vegas, Nevada by a 31–1 vote, pending the new Allegiant Stadium's completion. The Raiders soon announced plans to stay in Oakland until the new stadium was completed in 2020. Ground was broken on the new stadium on November 13, 2017.

==== Final years of the Gruden era and Rich Bisaccia (2020–2021) ====
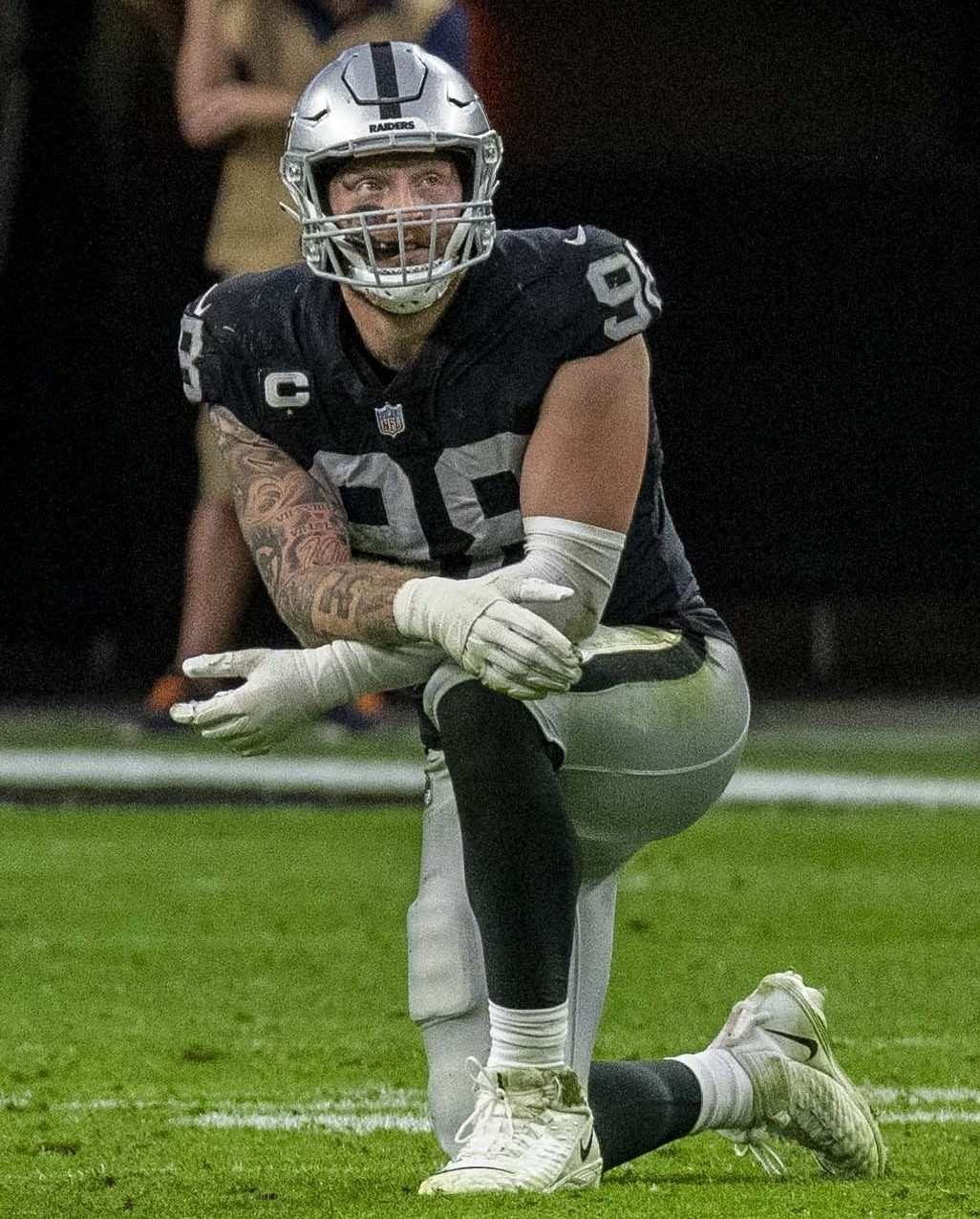
Maxx Crosby was drafted by the Raiders in the fourth round of the 2019 NFL Draft.

On January 22, 2020, it was announced that the Raiders had moved to Las Vegas. The Raiders played the 2020 season without fans in attendance for home games due to the ongoing COVID-19 pandemic. They started the season 6–3, but lost five of their last seven games to finish the season 8–8 and miss the playoffs for the fourth consecutive season.

A league investigation in 2021 revealed that Gruden had used racist, misogynistic, and homophobic language in emails in 2011 while working for ESPN. The emails referred to NFL commissioner Roger Goodell as a "faggot" and a "clueless anti football pussy". He also said Goodell should not have pressured the Rams to draft "queers", referring to Michael Sam, the first openly gay player drafted in NFL history. He also stated that players who protest the National Anthem should be "fired", specifically referring to former 49ers safety Eric Reid. Gruden also called then United States Vice President Joe Biden a "nervous clueless pussy". He resigned on October 11, 2021, after more details of the emails were released by The New York Times. Special Teams Coordinator, Rich Bisaccia, was named the interim head coach of the Raiders following Gruden's resignation. Shortly after the resignation, owner Mark Davis refused to comment on the controversy.

On November 2, 2021, starting wide receiver Henry Ruggs was arrested and charged with multiple felonies after killing a woman in a car crash. Later that day, the Raiders released Ruggs. On November 8, cornerback Damon Arnette was released after a video surfaced of him brandishing firearms. The Raiders finished with a 10–7 record and earned a Wild Card playoff berth. The Raiders saw their season end with a 26–19 loss to the Cincinnati Bengals in the Wild Card Round.

==== Josh McDaniels and Dave Ziegler era (2022–2023) Antonio Pierce (2024) ====
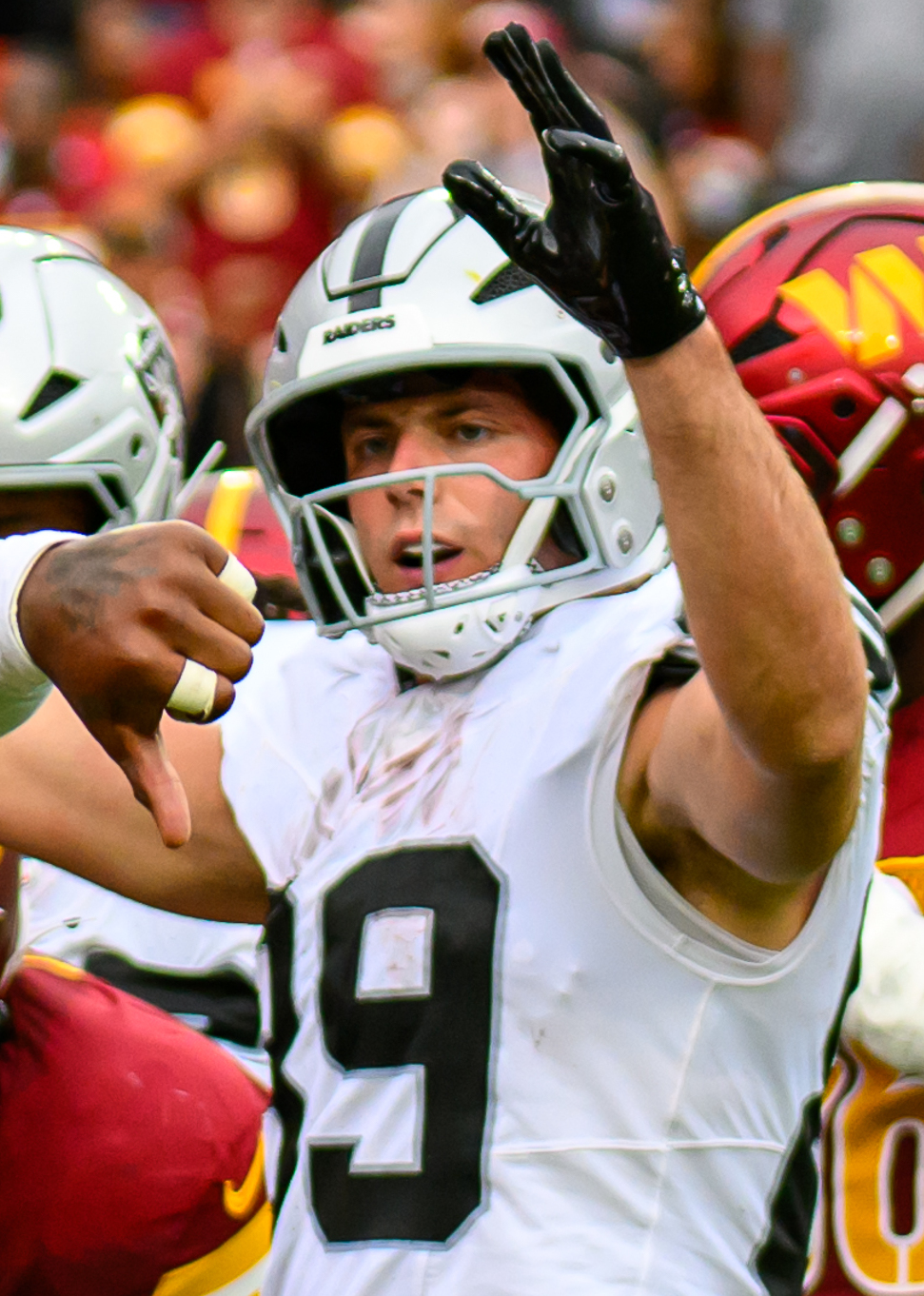
Brock Bowers is the single-season franchise receptions leader (112).

On January 30, 2022, the Raiders announced the hiring of Dave Ziegler as general manager. Ziegler was previously the director of player personnel for the New England Patriots and served in the Patriots scouting department from 2013 to 2021. On January 31, 2022, the Raiders announced the hiring of Josh McDaniels as head coach. On February 4, 2022, the Raiders announced the hiring of Patrick Graham as defensive coordinator. In the 2022 season, the Raiders finished with a 6–11 record. Following the season, the Raiders released Derek Carr.

In response to the release of Derek Carr, the Raiders signed Jimmy Garoppolo and drafted Aidan O'Connell. On October 31, 2023, the Raiders parted ways with head coach Josh McDaniels and general manager Dave Ziegler. Linebackers coach Antonio Pierce was named interim head coach and assistant general manager Champ Kelly was named interim general manager for the remainder of the 2023 season. On December 14, 2023, the team set a franchise record of most points scored in a game by scoring 63 points in their 63–21 victory over the Los Angeles Chargers. The Raiders finished with an 8–9 record (5–4 mark under Antonio Pierce) that saw a 20–14 upset victory over the Chiefs on Christmas Day. The team removed the interim tag from Pierce in January 2024, making him head coach of the franchise. After one season where he led the Raiders to a 4–13 record, including a 10-game losing streak, Pierce was fired as head coach.

==== Outside equity investment (2024) ====
In December 2024, the Raiders were among the first teams in NFL history to sell an ownership stake to outside private equity investors. 15% of the franchise was sold, with 10% going to Tom Brady and his business partner, Tom Wagner of Knighthead Capital, at a cost of $220 million. The deal valued the Raiders at $3.5 billion, much lower than previous estimates which had the team valued at $7.8 billion. As a result, Brady had to pay 10% in additional fees to league owners for the favorable terms to become part of the Raiders.

==== Pete Carroll and John Spytek era (2025) ====
On January 25, 2025, former USC and Seattle Seahawks coach Pete Carroll was hired as the head coach of the Raiders, departing Seattle after 15 years with the Seahawks organization. Upon coaching his first game for the Raiders, he became the oldest head coach (73) in NFL history. During the offseason, the Raiders traded for Geno Smith, reuniting Carroll with his former Seahawks quarterback. After one season with the Raiders, Carroll was fired on January 5, 2026, after leading the team to a 3–14 record.

==== Klint Kubiak era (2026–present) ====
On February 9, 2026, the Raiders hired Klint Kubiak as head coach, who had just won Super Bowl LX as offensive coordinator of the Seattle Seahawks. On April 6, the Raiders signed former Falcons and Vikings quarterback Kirk Cousins to a 5 year, $172 million contract. The team also drafted Indiana quarterback Fernando Mendoza with the first overall pick in the 2026 NFL draft.

== Championships ==
=== Super Bowl championships ===
The Raiders have won a total of three Super Bowl championships: twice during their tenure in Oakland, California (1976 and 1980), and once during their tenure in Los Angeles, California (1983). Their first title was under head coach John Madden, while the latter two were won with Tom Flores as head coach.

Las Vegas Raiders Super Bowl championships
Season	Coach	Super Bowl	Location	Opponent	Score
1976	John Madden	XI	Rose Bowl (Pasadena)	Minnesota Vikings	32–14
1980	Tom Flores	XV	Louisiana Superdome (New Orleans)	Philadelphia Eagles	27–10
1983	Tom Flores	XVIII	Tampa Stadium (Tampa)	Washington Redskins	38–9
Total Super Bowls won: 3

=== AFL / AFC championships ===
The Raiders franchise has compiled an extensive championship history, making 14 appearances in the AFL / AFC Championship Game since the start of the Super Bowl era (1966–present). They have captured four AFC Championships and one AFL Championship.

Las Vegas Raiders AFL / AFC championships
Season	Coach	Location	Opponent	Score
1967	John Rauch	Oakland-Alameda County Coliseum (Oakland)	Houston Oilers	40–7
1976	John Madden	Oakland-Alameda County Coliseum (Oakland)	Pittsburgh Steelers	24–7
1980	Tom Flores	Jack Murphy Stadium (San Diego)	San Diego Chargers	34–27
1983	Tom Flores	Los Angeles Memorial Coliseum (Los Angeles)	Seattle Seahawks	30–14
2002	Bill Callahan	Network Associates Coliseum (Oakland)	Tennessee Titans	41–24
Total AFC Championships won: 5

=== Division championships ===
Las Vegas Raiders division championships
Year	Coach	Record
1967	John Rauch	13–1
1968	John Rauch	12–2
1969	John Madden	12–1–1
1970	John Madden	8–4–2
1972	John Madden	10–3–1
1973	John Madden	9–4–1
1974	John Madden	12–2
1975	John Madden	11–3
1976	John Madden	13–1
1983	Tom Flores	12–4
1985	Tom Flores	12–4
1990	Art Shell	10–6
2000	Jon Gruden	12–4
2001	Jon Gruden	10–6
2002	Bill Callahan	11–5
Total Division Championships won: 15

== Logos and uniforms ==
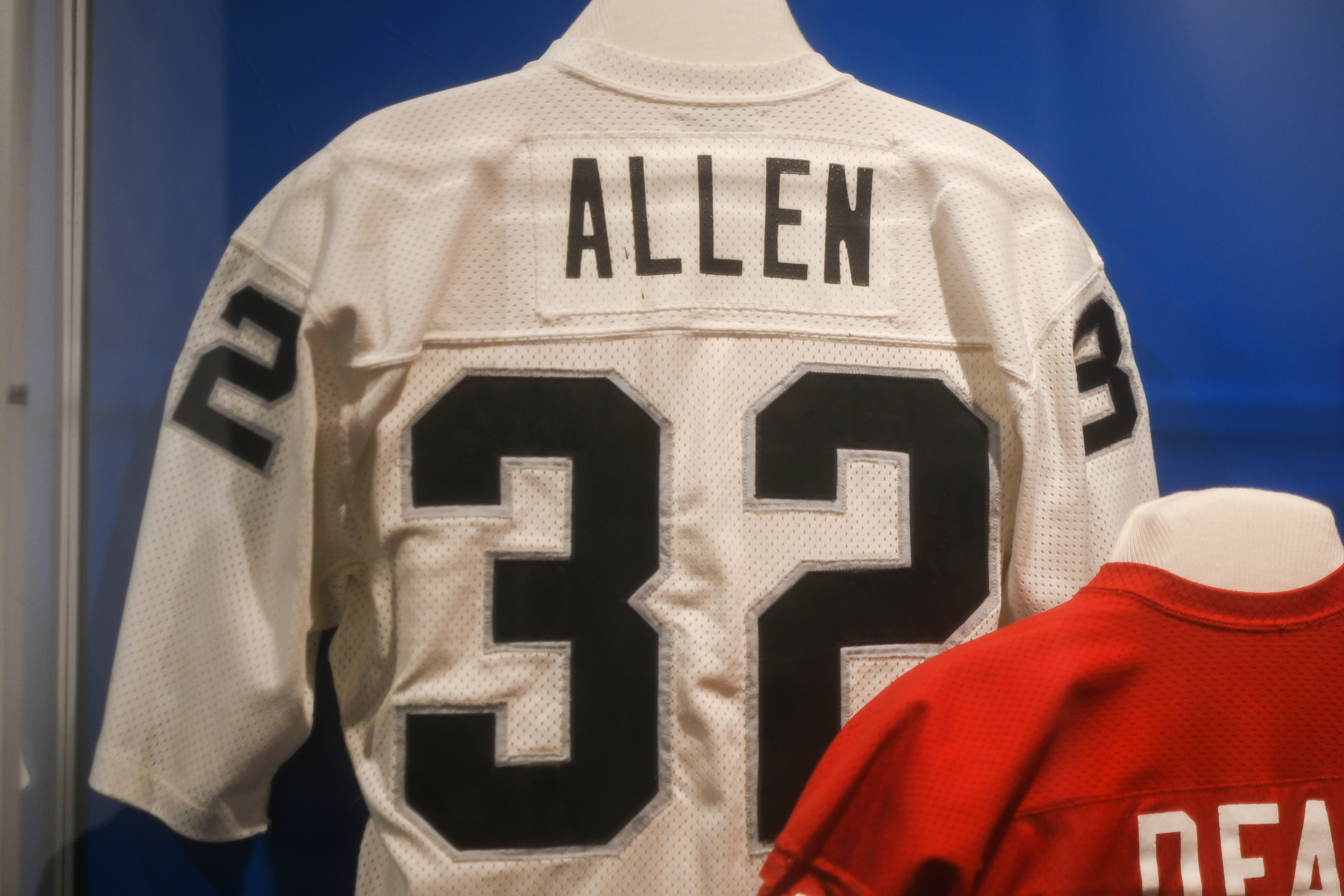
Raiders white uniform.

When the team was founded in 1960, the Oakland Tribune held a name-the-team contest. The winning name was the Oakland Señors. After a few days of being the butt of local jokes (and accusations that the contest was fixed, as Chet Soda was fairly well known within the Oakland business community for calling his acquaintances "señor"), the fledgling team (and its owners) changed the team's name nine days later to the Oakland Raiders, which had finished third in the naming contest. Chet Soda hired a well-known sportswriter, Gene Lawrence Perry, as the first Director of Public Relations. Perry (who was hired in 1959 as the first front-office hire) commissioned an unknown Berkeley artist and asked that a logo be created which included a helmeted man with an eye-patch, with the firm chin of a Randolph Scott, a well known Western film actor. The new owners had their newly minted Raiders logo, a pirate wearing a football helmet with an eye patch on a gold football background with two white swords in black trim with gold handles crossed behind the football.

The original Raiders uniforms were black and gold with Gothic numerals, while the helmets were black with a white stripe and no logo. The team wore this design from 1960 to 1962. In a very rare move, the jerseys displayed the player's full name on the back, before being pared down to only the surname in 1963. When Al Davis became head coach and general manager in 1963, he changed the team's color scheme to silver and black, and added a logo to the helmet. This logo is a shield that consists of the word "RAIDERS" at the top, two crossed cutlasses with handles up and cutting edge down, and superimposed head of a Raider wearing a football helmet and a black eye patch covering his right eye. Over the years, it has undergone minor color modifications (such as changing the background from silver to black in 1964), but it has essentially remained the same.

The Raiders' current silver and black uniform design has essentially remained the same since it debuted in 1963. It consists of silver helmets, silver pants, and either black or white jerseys. The black jerseys have silver lettering names and numbers, while the white jerseys have black lettering names and numbers with silver outlining the numbers only. Originally, the white jerseys had black letters for the names and silver numbers with a thick black outline, but they were changed to black with a silver outline for the 1964 season. In 1970, the team used silver numerals with black outline and black lettering names for the season. In 1971, the team again displayed black numerals and have stayed that way ever since (with the exception of the 1994 season as part of the NFL's 75th Anniversary where they donned the 1963 helmets with the 1970 silver away numbers and black lettering names).

The Raiders wore their white jerseys at home for the first time in their history on September 28, 2008, against the San Diego Chargers. The decision was made by Lane Kiffin, who was coaching his final game for the Raiders, and was purportedly due to intense heat. The high temperature in Oakland that day was 78°.

For the 2009 season, the Raiders took part in the AFL Legacy Program and wore 1960s throwback jerseys for games against other teams from the former AFL.

In the 2012 and 2013 seasons, the team wore black cleats as a tribute to Al Davis. The team reverted to white cleats in 2014, though in recent years the NFL relaxed its rules on primary cleat colors, allowing some players to wear black or gray/silver cleats.

In the 2016 season, the Raiders brought back their classic white jerseys with silver numerals as part of the NFL Color Rush initiative. Unlike the regular uniforms which are paired with silver pants and black/white socks, the Color Rush jerseys were paired with white pants with silver stripes and all-white socks. Starting in 2018, the Raiders retired the white pants but kept the throwback white jerseys, wearing them along with silver pants and black socks in a style reminiscent of the 1970 road set.

No changes to uniforms or logos were made during the team's move to Las Vegas, aside from changing "OAKLAND" to "LAS VEGAS" on various wordmark logos.

== Home fields ==
=== Stadium history ===
Stadium	Location	Duration
Kezar Stadium	San Francisco, California	1960
Candlestick Park	San Francisco, California	1961
Frank Youell Field	Oakland, California	1962–1965
Oakland-Alameda County Coliseum	Oakland, California	1966–1981
Los Angeles Memorial Coliseum	Los Angeles, California	1982–1994
Oakland-Alameda County Coliseum	Oakland, California	1995–2019
Allegiant Stadium	Paradise, Nevada	2020–present

When the team was established in 1960, Oakland lacked a stadium capable of hosting professional football. As a result, the Raiders spent their first two seasons playing across the bay in San Francisco at Kezar Stadium and Candlestick Park. To bring the team back to the East Bay, the city constructed Frank Youell Field, a temporary, bare-bones facility that served as the team's home until a permanent venue could be engineered.

The opening of the multi-purpose Oakland-Alameda County Coliseum in 1966 gave the Raiders a true home. The Raiders shared the Coliseum with the MLB's Oakland Athletics once the A's moved to Oakland from Kansas City in 1968. (Note: During a stadium scheduling conflict with the Athletics on September 23, 1973, the Raiders also played a single regular-season home game at California Memorial Stadium in Berkeley, breaking the Miami Dolphins' historic 18-game winning streak.)

Frustrated by a lack of stadium upgrades and the absence of luxury suites in Oakland, managing general partner Al Davis moved the team to the sprawling Los Angeles Memorial Coliseum in 1982. While the team won its third Super Bowl in Los Angeles, attendance fluctuated within the massive 93,000-seat venue, and Davis struggled to secure public funding for a modern stadium footprint in Southern California.

The Raiders returned to Northern California in 1995 after Oakland and Alameda County agreed to a massive stadium renovation. This construction project added a towering block of luxury boxes and regular seating in the outfield known colloquially as "Mount Davis". While it secured the team's immediate future, the modification severely altered the Coliseum's classic look and failed to solve long-term facility struggles, rendering it the second-smallest stadium in the NFL by 2019.

Failing to secure a viable replacement stadium layout in Oakland, owner Mark Davis finalized a relocation plan to Southern Nevada. The team moved into the ultra-modern, $1.9 billion indoor Allegiant Stadium adjacent to the Las Vegas Strip in 2020. The Raiders share the stadium with the UNLV Rebels football program.

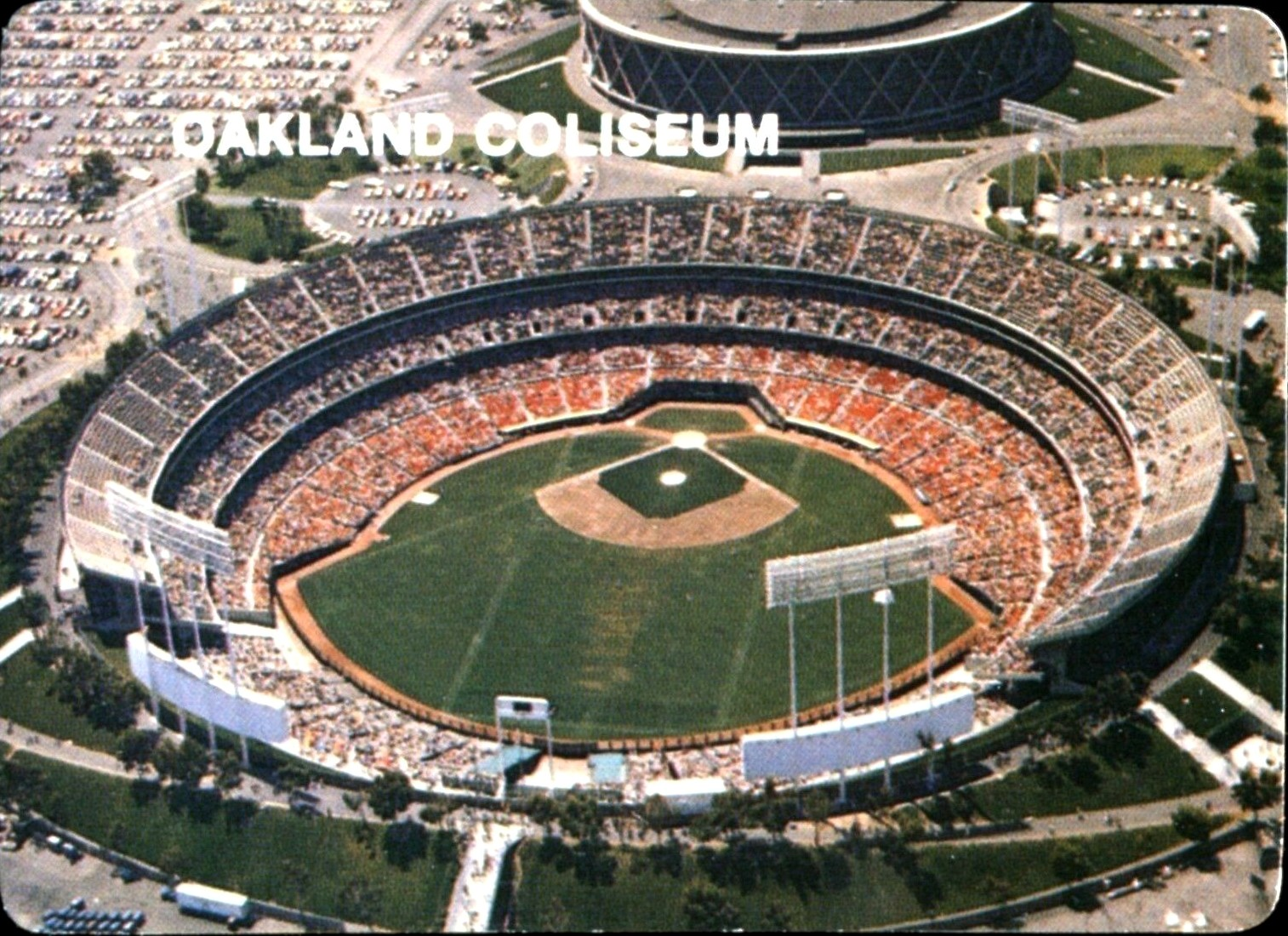
Oakland-Alameda County Coliseum
(Oakland, California)

Los Angeles Memorial Coliseum
(Los Angeles, California)

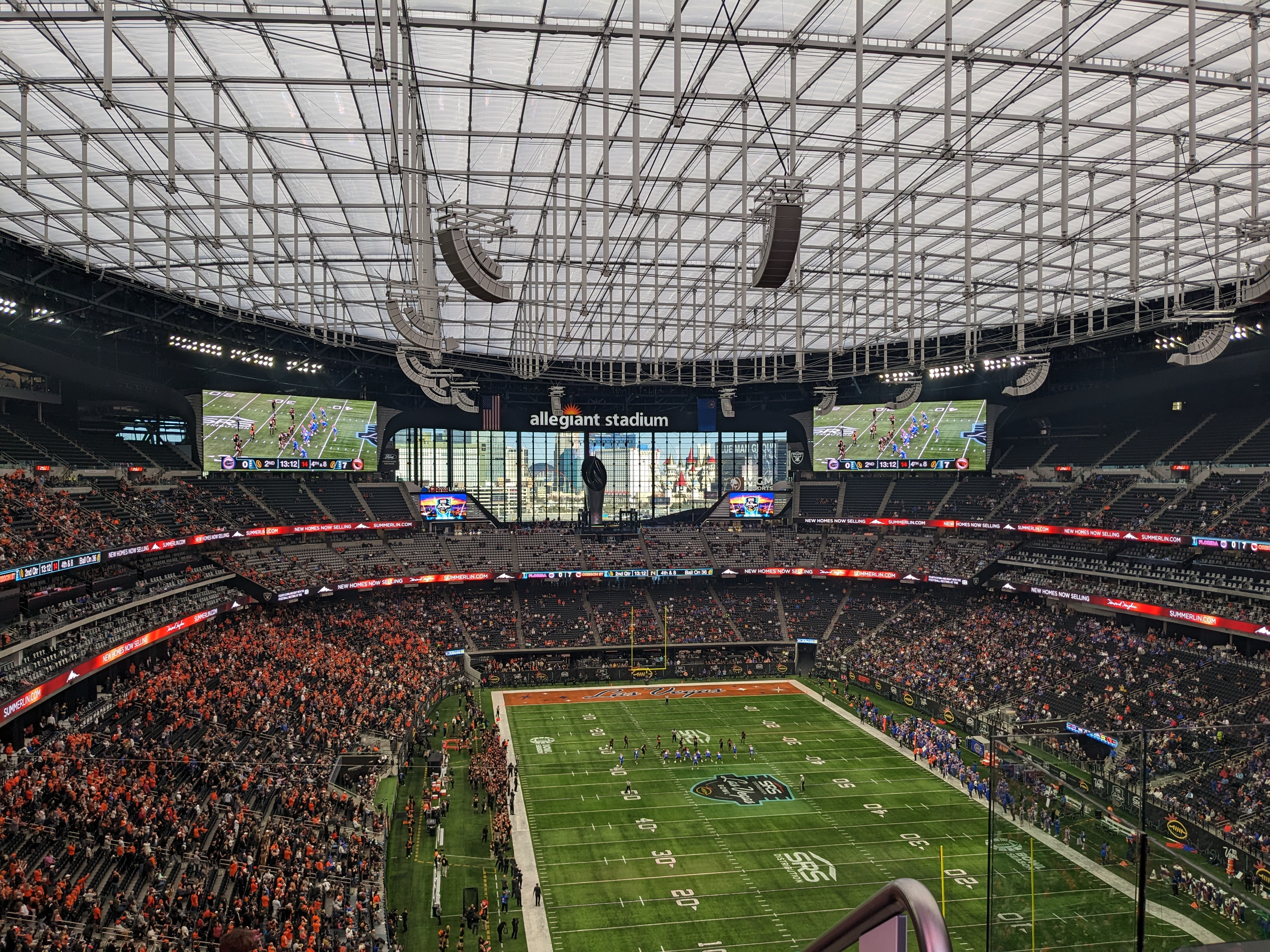
Allegiant Stadium
(Paradise, Nevada)

== Culture ==
=== Slogans ===
Al Davis coined slogans such as "Pride and Poise", "Commitment to Excellence", and "Just Win, Baby"—all of which are registered trademarks of the team. "Commitment to Excellence" comes from a quote from Vince Lombardi, "The quality of a person's life is in direct proportion to their commitment to excellence, regardless of their chosen field of endeavor."

=== Raider Nation ===
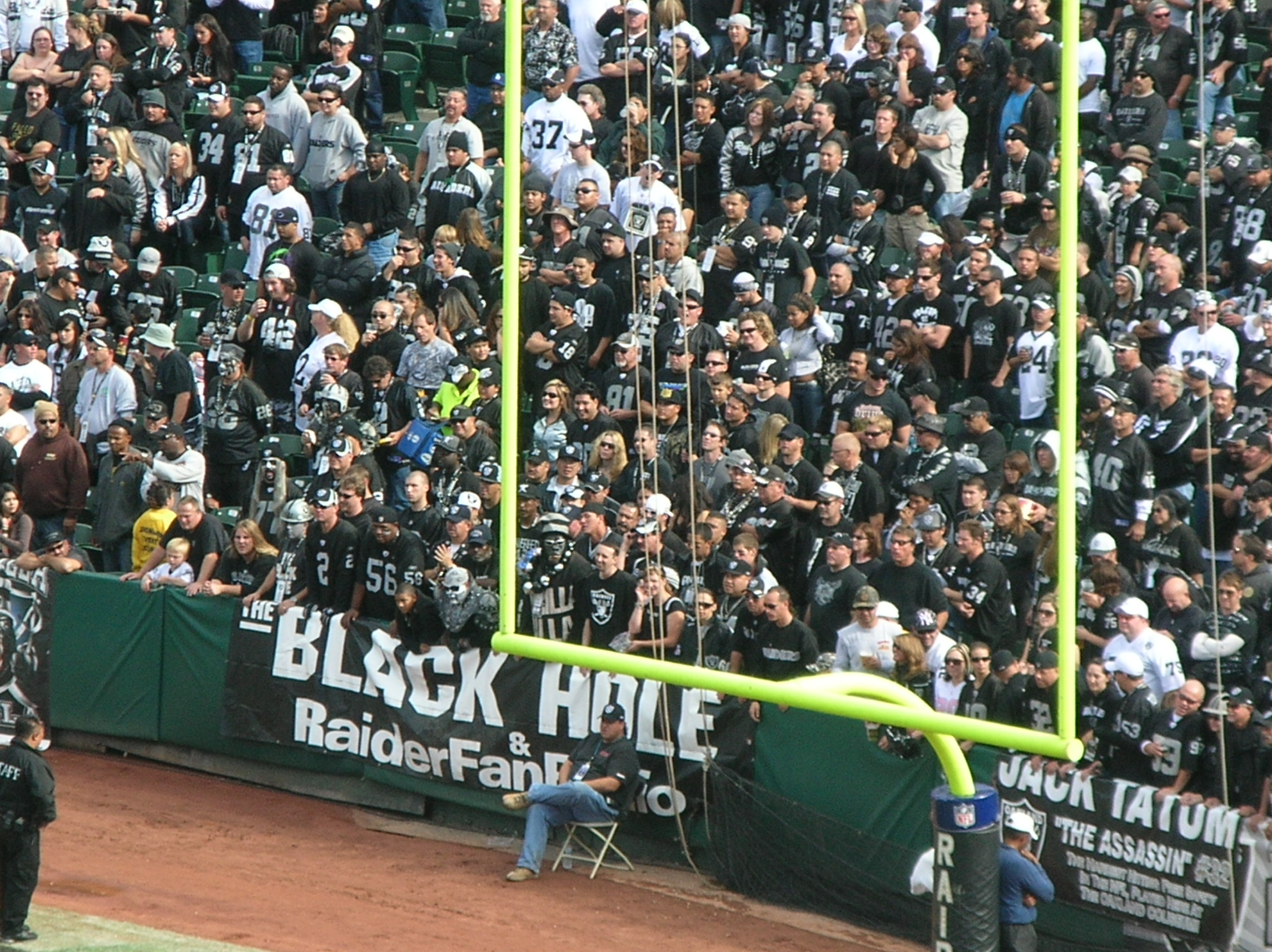
The Raider Nation is the unofficial name for the fans of the Las Vegas Raiders. They were previously associated with a section of the Oakland Coliseum known as the "Black Hole" before the team's move to Las Vegas.

The nickname Raider Nation refers to the fans of the team spread throughout the United States and the world. Members of the Raider Nation who attend home games are known for arriving to the stadium early, tailgating, and dressing up in face masks and black outfits. The Raider Nation is also known for the Black Hole, originally a specific area of the Coliseum (sections 104–107) frequented by the team's rowdiest and most fervent fans from 1995 until 2019.

Al Davis created the phrase Raider Nation in 1968. In September 2009, Ice Cube recorded a song for the Raiders named "Raider Nation". In 2010, Davis took part in a documentary for ESPN's 30 for 30 series titled Straight Outta L.A.. It mainly focuses on N.W.A and the effect of the Raiders' image on their persona. In 2012, Ice Cube wrote another song for the Raiders as part of Pepsi's NFL Anthems campaign, "Come and Get It". It was released on September 14, 2012.

== Cheerleaders ==
The Las Vegas Raiderettes are the cheerleading squad for the Las Vegas Raiders. They were established in 1961 as the Oakland Raiderettes. During the team's time in Los Angeles they were the Los Angeles Raiderettes. They have been billed as "Football's Fabulous Females".

== Radio and television ==
=== Las Vegas Raiders Radio Network ===
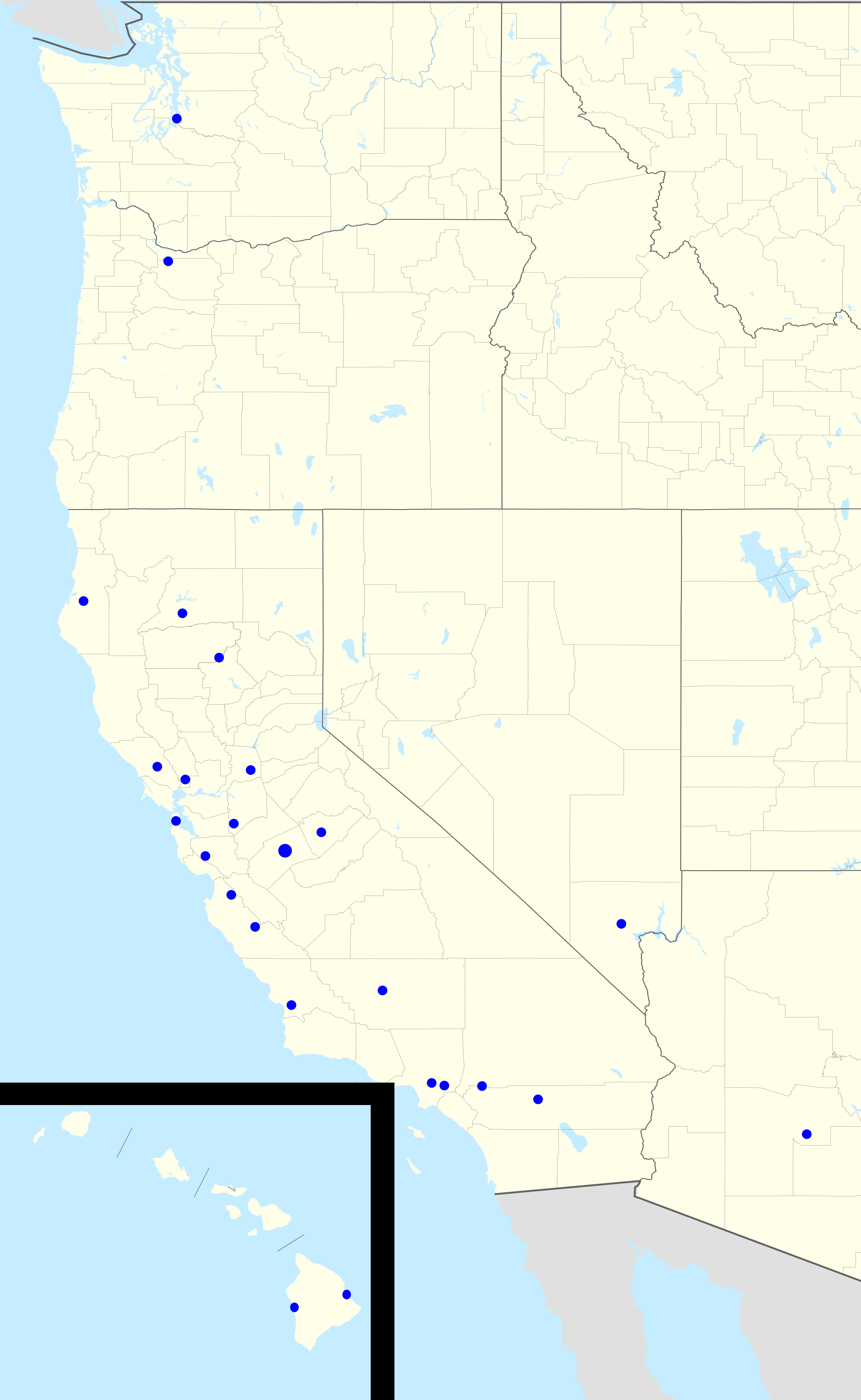
Map of radio affiliates in the western U.S.

Raider games are broadcast in English on 36 radio stations across the western United States, including flagship stations KOMP 92.3 FM The Rock Station and KRLV Raider Nation Radio 920AM in Las Vegas. Games are broadcast on radio stations in Nevada, California, Oregon, Colorado, Hawaii, and Arkansas. Jason Horowitz is the play-by-play announcer, along with former Raiders tackle Lincoln Kennedy doing commentary. George Atkinson and Jim Plunkett offer pre- and post-game commentary. Compass Media Networks is responsible for producing and distributing Raiders radio broadcasts. Raider games are broadcast in Spanish on 8 radio stations across Nevada and California, including flagship Spanish language station KENO 1460 Deportes Vegas in Las Vegas. Cristian Echeverria is the Spanish-language play-by-play announcer with Harry Ruiz doing commentary.

Bill King was the voice of the Raiders from 1966 to 1992, during which time he called approximately 600 games. The Raiders awarded him rings for all three of their Super Bowl victories. It is King's radio audio heard on most of the NFL Films highlight footage of the Raiders. King's call of the Holy Roller has been labeled (by Chris Berman, among others) as one of the five best in NFL history. King died in October 2005 from complications after surgery. Former San Francisco 49ers tight end Monty Stickles and Scotty Stirling, an Oakland Tribune sportswriter, served as color commentators with King. The Raider games were called on radio from 1960 to 1962 by Bud (Wilson Keene) Foster and Mel Venter, and from 1963 to 1965 by Bob Blum and Dan Galvin. Until their dismissal before the 2018 season, Greg Papa was the voice of the Raiders with former Raiders quarterback and coach Tom Flores doing commentary from 1997 to 2017. From 2018 until 2022 Brent Musburger was the voice of the Raiders.

In June 2017, it was announced that Beasley Media Group signed a two-year deal as the Las Vegas flagship radio partner of the Raiders. Beasley's stations KCYE (102.7) "The Coyote" and KDWN (720) began carrying all preseason and regular season games in the 2017 season. Beginning with the 2019 season, the Raiders' Las Vegas flagship station became "93.1 The Mountain" KYMT. In 2020, a deal was signed with Lotus Broadcasting to make KOMP the Raiders flagship station and re-brand KBAD to KRLV Raider Nation Radio.

=== Television ===
The Raiders' games are broadcast in Las Vegas on CBS affiliate KLAS-TV (channel 8) and in the Bay Area on CBS owned-and-operated station KPIX-TV (channel 5) (when playing an AFC opponent) and on Las Vegas Fox affiliate KVVU-TV (channel 5) and in the Bay Area on Fox owned-and-operated station KTVU (channel 2) (when hosting an NFC opponent), unless there is an NFL blackout locally. Sunday night games are on Las Vegas NBC affiliate KSNV (channel 3) and in the Bay Area on NBC owned-and-operated station KNTV (channel 11). In 2018, Thursday games moved to KTVU and KVVU-TV in Oakland and Las Vegas, respectively, formerly airing on either NBC or CBS before 2018. All Thursday games air on NFL Network otherwise. Traditionally, Monday night games airing on ESPN would air on ABC affiliate KTNV-TV (channel 13) in Las Vegas and ABC owned-and-operated station KGO-TV (channel 7) in San Francisco.

During the team's two tenures in Oakland, the Raiders were a beneficiary of league scheduling policies. Both the Raiders and the San Francisco 49ers shared the San Francisco Bay Area market, on the West Coast of the United States. This meant that the Raiders could not play any home games, road division games against the Denver Broncos or Los Angeles Chargers, or interconference road games against the NFC West (in seasons that the AFC West and NFC West meet in interconference play) in the early 10:00 a.m. Pacific time slot. In addition, they could not play interconference home games at the same time or network as the 49ers. As a result, both teams generally had more limited scheduling options and also benefited by receiving more prime time games than usual.

Starting shortly after the announcement of the Raiders' move to Las Vegas, KVVU-TV, the local Fox affiliate in Las Vegas began carrying all of the team's preseason games and special content. In 2020, a deal was made with Nexstar Media Group for stations in Raiders markets placing Raiders preseason and special content on KRON-TV (moving from KTVU) in the Bay Area, KTLA in Los Angeles, KTVX in Salt Lake City, KHON-TV in Honolulu, and KGET-TV in Bakersfield alongside KVVU and KLAS in Las Vegas.

== Rivalries ==
=== Divisional rivals ===
==== Kansas City Chiefs ====
The Chiefs are one of the Raiders' most iconic and longstanding divisional foes, with the rivalry dating back to the earliest days of the AFL. Oakland lost the 1969 AFL Championship against Kansas City, who went on to beat the Minnesota Vikings and win the Super Bowl. From 1990 to 1999, the Raiders lost 17 out of 20 regular-season meetings between the Chiefs, including a 10–game losing streak at Kansas City; the Raiders also lost to the Chiefs 10–6 in the Wild Card round on December 28, 1991. On September 8, 1996, the Chiefs also began to lead the overall series against the Raiders for the first time since November 23, 1969. On January 1, 2000, the last game of the 1999 NFL regular season, the Raiders defeated the Chiefs for the first time in Kansas City since 1988 in overtime on a 33-yard field goal kick made by Joe Nedney. Until October 19, 2017 – when they defeated the Chiefs, 31–30 on a game-tying touchdown on the last play of the game, leading to a game-winning PAT – the Raiders had lost five straight to the Chiefs, their previous win against them being in the 2014 season. However, the Raiders would defeat the Chiefs 40–32 in the 2020, snapping a five-game losing streak and also winning in Kansas City for the first time since 2012. On Christmas Day 2023, the Raiders defeated the Chiefs and snapped another five-game losing streak.

The Chiefs lead the overall series 71–54–2, and are the only team that plays in the current AFC West against whom the Raiders have a losing record.

==== Denver Broncos ====
The Raiders' rivalry with the Broncos is considered to be one of the most heated and well-known rivalries in NFL history. The Raiders managed a 14-game winning streak against the Broncos from 1965 to 1971, which lasted until October 22, 1972, when the Broncos defeated the Raiders 30–23. The Broncos amassed 21 wins in 28 games, from the 1995 season and the arrival of Broncos head coach Mike Shanahan, through the 2008 season. Shanahan coached the Raiders before being fired just four games into the 1989 season, which served to intensify this rivalry. On December 13, 2015, the Raiders pulled a huge upset on the Broncos (15–12) by a spectacular performance from their defense allowing only four field goals. Linebacker Khalil Mack recorded five sacks in that game which is tied for the most sacks in a game with Howie Long. The Broncos reached their first-ever Super Bowl when they defeated the Raiders 20–17 in the AFC Championship Game. The two teams have faced off on Monday Night Football a total of 19 times, making it the most frequent Monday Night matchup in NFL history.

Raiders hold the advantage in the all-time series 72–53–2.

==== Los Angeles Chargers ====
The Los Angeles Chargers' rivalry with Oakland dates to the 1963 season, when the Raiders defeated the heavily favored Chargers twice, both come-from-behind fourth-quarter victories. The Raiders held a streak without losing to the Chargers with a 16–0–2 record from 1968 to 1977. One of the most memorable games between these teams was the "Holy Roller" game in 1978, in which the Raiders fumbled for a touchdown in a very controversial play. In January 1981 the Chargers hosted their first AFC title against the Raiders. The Raiders were victorious over the Chargers of a score 34–27. The Raiders ended up moving on to play in Super Bowl 15 defeating the Eagles 27–10. On November 22, 1982, the Raiders hosted their first Monday Night football game in Los Angeles against the San Diego Chargers. The Chargers led the game in the 1st half 24–0 until the Raiders came into the 2nd half and made a huge comeback and defeated the San Diego Chargers 28–24. On October 10, 2010, the Raiders ended their 13-game losing streak to the San Diego Chargers with a score of 35–27. The Raiders hold the overall series advantage at 67–57–2.

=== Conference ===
==== Pittsburgh Steelers ====
The Pittsburgh Steelers' rivalry with the Raiders has historically been very tight; as of the 2018 season the Raiders lead the regular-season series 13 wins to 10, and their playoff rivalry is tied 3–3. The rivalry was extremely intense during the 1970s, and considered by many to be one of the most vicious and brutal in the history of Professional football. From 1972 to 1976 the teams would meet in the playoffs five consecutive times, including three consecutive AFC Championship games. The rivalry really kicked off during the teams' first playoff meeting at the 1972 AFC divisional round in Pittsburgh. Considered to be one of the most famous plays in NFL history, the "Immaculate Reception", as it was dubbed, saw the Steelers beat the Raiders on a controversial last-second play. During the 1975 AFC Championship game, Raiders strong safety George Atkinson delivered a hit on Pittsburgh wide receiver Lynn Swann, which left him concussed. When the two teams met in the 1976 season opener, Atkinson again hit Swann, this time with a forearm to the head, causing yet another concussion. After the second incident, Steelers head coach Chuck Noll referred to Atkinson as part of the "criminal element" in the NFL. Atkinson filed a $2 million defamation lawsuit against Noll and the Steelers, which he lost. The rivalry reached its apex in the late 1980s, cooled when the teams faced each other only sporadically, then headed up again in the late 1990s before cooling again. The four most recent contests between the Raiders and Steelers harkened back to the rivalry's history of bitterness and close competition. On December 6, 2009, the 3–8 Raiders helped spoil the defending champions' quest for the playoffs as the game lead changed five times in the fourth quarter and a Louis Murphy touchdown with 11 seconds to go won it 27–24 for the Raiders. Oakland was then beaten 35–3 by Pittsburgh on November 21, 2010; this game brought out the roughness of the rivalry's 1970s history when Steelers quarterback Ben Roethlisberger was punched by Raiders defensive end Richard Seymour following a touchdown. On November 8, 2015, the Steelers outplayed the Raiders, winning 38–35. During the game, the Raiders defense allowed wide receiver Antonio Brown to catch 17 passes for 284 yards. Both are Steelers team records and the 284 yards is the 7th most yards receiving in a game in NFL history. In 2018, the Raiders upset the Steelers again, scoring a late touchdown to take a 24–21 fourth-quarter lead and getting the last laugh when Steelers kicker Chris Boswell slipped and missed a game-tying field goal. This game, which was the teams' final matchup in Oakland, contributed to the Steelers' late-season collapse and missing the playoffs that year. As of the 2023 season, the Raiders lead the all-time series 17–15.

==== New England Patriots ====
The rivalry between the Raiders and New England Patriots dates to their time in the AFL, but was intensified during a 1978 preseason game, when Patriots wide receiver Darryl Stingley was permanently paralyzed after a vicious hit delivered by Raiders free safety Jack Tatum. Before that, New England also lost a playoff game in 1976 to the Raiders; the game is unofficially known as "The Ben Dreith Game" due to a controversial penalty by head referee Dreith. While based in Los Angeles, the team hosted New England in the divisional round of the playoffs in 1986. The game was won by New England and marred by a chaotic rumble between the teams in the end zone as players were leaving the field after the game. The brawl was especially notable for Matt Millen attacking Patriots GM Patrick Sullivan with his helmet. The two teams met in a divisional round playoff game in 2002, which became known as the "Tuck Rule Game". Late in the game, an incomplete pass, ruled a fumble, by Patriots quarterback Tom Brady was overturned, and New England went on to win in overtime and eventually won the Super Bowl against the heavily favored St. Louis Rams, the Raiders' former crosstown rivals in Los Angeles. Since that game, the Patriots have won five of the last six regular-season contests between the two teams. The first contest being the following year during the 2002 season in Oakland, with the Raiders winning 27–20; they met in the 2005 season opener in New England with the Patriots ruining Randy Moss' debut as a Raider 30–20; the Patriots defeated the Raiders 49–26 in December 2008 in Bill Belichick's 100th regular-season win as Patriots coach; a Patriots 31–19 win during the 2011 season; a scrappy 16–9 Patriots win in the third week of the 2014 season, and the Patriots' 33–8 win in Mexico City in 2017. The Raiders would not beat New England again until 2022, after they moved to Las Vegas, with a failed lateral pass play by New England at the end of regulation resulting in a walk-off touchdown and a 30–24 win for the Raiders. The teams met again in the following season with the Raiders winning 21–17. As of the 2023 season, the Patriots lead the all-time series 20–17–1.

=== Historic ===
==== Miami Dolphins ====
The Raiders faced the Miami Dolphins thrice in the early 1970s. The Raiders defeated the Dolphins 21–14 in the 1970 divisional round, then the Dolphins exacted revenge in the 1973 AFC Championship Game by winning 27–10 on their way to Super Bowl VIII. The next year in the divisional playoffs the Raiders trailed Miami 26–21; in the final minute the Raiders drove to the Miami eight-yard line; a desperation pass by Ken Stabler was caught in traffic by Clarence Davis in the play known as the "Sea of Hands". As of the 2023 season, the Raiders lead the all-time series 21–20–1.

==== New York Jets ====
The New York Jets began a strong rivalry with the Raiders in the AFL during the 1960s that continued through much of the 1970s, fueled in part by Raider Ike Lassiter breaking star quarterback Joe Namath's jaw during a 1967 game (though Ben Davidson was wrongly blamed), the famous Heidi Game during the 1968 season, and the Raiders' bitter loss to the Jets in the AFL Championship later that season. The rivalry waned in later years, but saw a minor resurgence in the 2000–02 period. The Jets edged the Raiders in the final week of the 2001 season 24–22 on a last-second John Hall field goal; the Raiders hosted the Jets in the Wild Card round the following Saturday and won 38–24. In the 2002 season the Raiders defeated the Jets 26–20 in December, then defeated them again in the AFC Divisional Playoffs, 30–10. The Raiders lost the 37–27 on December 8, 2013, but won the most recent matchup 20–34 on November 1, 2015. In the next two meetings, the two teams had very close games with each other. In 2020, Derek Carr threw a game-winning touchdown to Henry Ruggs, defeating them 31–28. They met again in 2023 where the Raiders won 18–12, preventing a pass that would've been a Hail Mary. As of the 2023 season, the Raiders lead the all-time series 27–20–2.

==== Seattle Seahawks ====
As of the 2023 season, the Raiders lead the all-time series 30–26.

==== Houston Oilers/Tennessee Titans ====
The Raiders faced the Houston Oilers throughout the AFL era and twice in AFL playoffs in the late 1960s, winning 40–7 in 1967 on their way to Super Bowl II and 56–7 in the 1969 divisional playoffs. Oakland defeated the Oilers in the 1980 Wild Card playoffs 27–7 and defeated the Titans in the 2002 AFC Championship Game 41–24. As of the 2023 season, the Raiders lead the all-time series 30–22.

==== Battle of the Bay ====
The San Francisco 49ers, located on the other side of San Francisco Bay, were the Raiders' geographic rivals during the Raiders' time in Oakland. The first exhibition game, played in 1967, ended with the 49ers defeating the AFL Raiders 13–10. After the 1970 merger, the 49ers won in Oakland 38–7. As a result, games between the two are referred to as the "Battle of the Bay". Since the two teams play in different conferences, regular season matchups happen only once every four years. Fans and players of the winning team could claim "bragging rights" as the better team in the area. On August 20, 2011, in the third week of the preseason, the preseason game between the rivals was marked by fights in restrooms and stands at Candlestick Park, including a shooting outside the stadium in which several were injured. The NFL has decided to cancel all future preseason games between the Raiders and 49ers. The series ended on November 1, 2018, during a Thursday Night Football broadcast at Levi's Stadium, marking the last time both teams would meet before the Raiders moved to their new home in Las Vegas. The 49ers won the game 34–3 to tie their regular-season series at 7. As of the 2023 season, the 49ers lead the all-time series 8–7.

==== Battle of Los Angeles ====
Initially considered the "Battle of Los Angeles" during the Raiders' tenure in Los Angeles from 1982 to 1994, the Raiders shared the market with the Los Angeles Rams during this period, sparking a fight for LA's dominant fans until both teams moved due to declining attendance and mutual stadium issues following the 1994 season. The rivalry became nonexistent as the Rams had also moved to St. Louis the same year. The Raiders unsuccessfully attempted to move back to Los Angeles in 2015 after a failed joint stadium project with the then-San Diego Chargers. As of the 2023 season, the Raiders lead the all-time series 8–7.

== Ownership, administration and financial operations ==
=== Founding of the franchise ===
Max Winter, a Minneapolis businessman, was among the eight proposed franchise owners in the American Football League. In a move typical of the NFL owners who were frightened by the prospect of competition and continually obstructed the new league, they offered Winter an expansion franchise in the NFL. This was after the NFL had rejected Lamar Hunt's feelers, saying they were not interested in expansion. One of many obfuscations put forward by the NFL in its attempt to derail the AFL.

After the AFL's first draft, in which players were selected for the then-nameless Minneapolis franchise, Winter reneged on his agreement with the AFL owners and defected to the NFL, where he founded a franchise that began play in 1961 and was named the Minnesota Vikings. The Vikings were never an AFL team, nor did they have any association with the AFL. Many of the players (including Abner Haynes) that had been assigned to the UNNAMED and defunct Minneapolis AFL franchise were signed by some of the seven loyal remaining members of the AFL's 'Foolish Club'.

The city of Oakland was awarded the eighth AFL franchise on January 30, 1960. Once the consortium of owners was found for the eighth franchise, the team was named the Raiders. Because many of the defunct Minneapolis franchise's originally drafted players were signed by other AFL teams, the AFL held an 'allocation' draft, in which each team earmarked players that could be chosen by the Raiders.

The Minneapolis group did not take with them any of the rights to players they drafted when they defected to the NFL, because their first draft in that league was in 1961. The Raiders were not originally in Minnesota as some claim. They were a new, charter franchise in the American Football League. One reason they were so weak in the first few years of the AFL was that the other AFL teams did not make quality players available in the allocation draft.

At the time, Oakland seemed an unlikely venue for a professional football team. The city had not asked for a team, there was no ownership group and there was no stadium in Oakland suitable for pro football (the closest stadiums were in Berkeley and San Francisco) and there was already a successful NFL franchise in the Bay Area in the San Francisco 49ers. The AFL owners selected Oakland after Los Angeles Chargers owner Barron Hilton threatened to forfeit his franchise unless a second team was placed on the West Coast.

Upon receiving the franchise, Oakland civic leaders found a number of business people willing to invest in the new team. A limited partnership was formed to own the team headed by managing general partner Y. Charles (Chet) Soda (1908–1989), a local real estate developer, and included general partners Ed McGah (1899–1983), Robert Osborne (1898–1968), F. Wayne Valley (1914–1986), restaurateur Harvey Binns (1914–1982), Don Blessing (1904–2000), and contractor Charles Harney (1902–1962) as well as numerous limited partners.

The Raiders finished their first campaign with a 6–8 record, and lost $500,000. Desperately in need of money to continue running the team, Valley received a $400,000 loan from Buffalo Bills founder Ralph C. Wilson Jr.

After the conclusion of the first season Soda dropped out of the partnership, and on January 17, 1961, Valley, McGah and Osborne bought out the remaining four general partners. Soon after, Valley and McGah purchased Osborne's interest, with Valley named as the managing general partner.

In 1962 Valley hired Al Davis, a former assistant coach for the San Diego Chargers, as head coach and general manager. In April 1966 Davis left the Raiders after being named AFL Commissioner. Two months later, the league announced its merger with the NFL. With the merger, the position of commissioner was no longer needed, and Davis entered into discussions with Valley about returning to the Raiders. On July 25, 1966, Davis returned as part owner of the team. He purchased a 10% interest in the team for US$18,000, and became the team's third general partner. As part of the deal, Davis was also given control over football operations.

In 1972, with Wayne Valley out of the country for several weeks attending the Olympic Games in Munich, Davis's attorneys drafted a revised partnership agreement that made him the new managing general partner, with complete control over all of the Raiders' operations. McGah, a supporter of Davis, signed the agreement. Under partnership law, by a 2–1 vote of the general partners, the new agreement was thus ratified. Valley was furious when he discovered this, and immediately filed suit to have the new agreement overturned, but the court sided with Davis and McGah.

In 1976 Valley sold his interest in the team. Although Davis only owned 25 percent of the team, no other partners have had any voice in team operations since.

==== Current ownership structure ====
Legally, the club is owned by a nine-member limited partnership. A. D. Football, Inc., the company founded by Al Davis to hold his interest, is the sole general partner. The heirs of the original eight partners are limited partners.

From 1972 onward, Davis had exercised near-total control of the Raiders as president of A.D. Football, Inc. Although exact ownership stakes are not known, it has been reported that Davis owned 47% of the team shares before his death in 2011. The limited partners have almost no role in team operations, though they were briefly mentioned in team media guides. Many of them had not watched, let alone attended, Raiders games in years at the time of Davis' death.

Ed McGah, the last surviving member of the original ownership group, died in September 1983. Upon his death, his interest was devised to a family trust, of which his son, E.J. McGah, was the trustee. The younger McGah was himself a part owner of the team, as a limited partner, and died in 2002. Several members of the McGah family filed suit against Davis in October 2003, alleging mismanagement of the team by Davis. The lawsuit sought monetary damages and to remove Davis and AD Football, Inc. as general partner. Among their specific complaints, the McGahs alleged that Davis failed to provide them with detailed financial information previously provided to Ed and E.J. McGah. The Raiders countered that—under the terms of the partnership agreement as amended in 1972—upon the death of the elder McGah in 1983, his general partnership interest converted to that of a limited partner. The team continued to provide the financial information to the younger McGah as a courtesy, though it was under no obligation to do so.

The majority of the lawsuit was dismissed in April 2004, when an Alameda County Superior Court judge ruled that the case lacked merit since none of the other partners took part in the lawsuit. In October 2005 the lawsuit was settled out of court. The terms of the settlement are confidential, but it was reported that under its terms Davis purchased the McGah family's interest in the Raiders (approximately 31%), which gave him for the first time a majority interest, speculated to be approximately 67% of the team. As a result of the settlement, confidential details concerning Al Davis and the ownership of the Raiders were not released to the public.

In 2006 it was reported that Davis had been attempting to sell the 31% ownership stake in the team obtained from the McGah family. He was unsuccessful in this effort, reportedly because the sale would not give the purchaser any control of the Raiders, even in the event of Davis's death.

Al Davis died on October 8, 2011, at age 82. According to a 1999 partnership agreement, Davis' interest passed to his wife, Carol. After Davis' death, Raiders chief executive Amy Trask said that the team "will remain in the Davis family." Al and Carol's son, Mark, took over his father's old post as managing general partner and was operating head of the franchise even before his mother's death in 2025. Unlike his father, Mark mostly leaves on-field matters to the football operations staff.

=== Financial operations ===
According to a 2017 report released by Forbes Magazine, the Raiders' overall team value is US 2.38 billion ranked 19th out of 32 NFL teams. This valuation was made after the team said it would move to Las Vegas by 2020 and into a new stadium which increased the team's value 19 percent.

Although the team has regularly sold out since 2013, the team ranked in the bottom three in league attendance from 2003 to 2005, and failed to sell out a majority of their home games. One of the reasons cited for the poor attendance figures was the decision to issue costly personal seat licenses (PSLs) upon the Raiders' return to Oakland in 1995. The PSLs, which ranged in cost from $250 to $4,000, were meant to help repay the $200 million it cost the city of Oakland and Alameda County to expand the Oakland Coliseum. They were only valid for ten years, while other teams issue them permanently. As a result, fewer than 31,000 PSLs were sold for a stadium that holds twice that number. From 1995 until the lifting of the policy in 2014 television blackouts of Raiders home games were common.

In November 2005 the team announced that it was taking over ticket sales from the privately run Oakland Football Marketing Association (OFMA), and abolishing PSLs. In February 2006 the team also announced that it would lower ticket prices for most areas of the Oakland Coliseum. Just before the start of the 2006 NFL season, the Raiders revealed that they had sold 37,000 season tickets, up from 29,000 the previous year. Despite the team's 2–14 record, they sold out six of their eight home games in 2006.

=== Legal battles ===
The Raiders and Al Davis have been involved in several lawsuits throughout their history, including ones against the NFL. When the NFL declined to approve the Raiders' move from Oakland to Los Angeles in 1980, the team joined the Los Angeles Memorial Coliseum Commission in a lawsuit against the league alleging a violation of antitrust laws. The Coliseum Commission received a settlement from the NFL of $19.6 million in 1987. In 1986, Davis testified on behalf of the United States Football League in their unsuccessful antitrust lawsuit against the NFL. He was the only NFL owner to do so.

After moving back to Oakland, the team sued the NFL for interfering with their negotiations to build a new stadium at Hollywood Park before the move. The Raiders' lawsuit further contended that they had the rights to the Los Angeles market, and thus were entitled to compensation from the league for giving up those rights by moving to Oakland. A jury found in favor of the NFL in 2001, but the verdict was overturned a year later due to alleged juror misconduct. In February 2005, a California Court of Appeal unanimously upheld the original verdict.

When the Raiders moved back from Los Angeles in 1995, the city of Oakland and the Oakland–Alameda County Coliseum Authority agreed to sell Personal Seat Licenses (PSLs) to help pay for the renovations to their stadium. But after games rarely sold out, the Raiders filed suit, claiming that they were misled by the city and the Coliseum Authority with the false promise that there would be sellouts. On November 2, 2005, a settlement was announced, part of which was the abolishment of PSLs as of the 2006 season.

==== Trademark and trade dress dilution ====
In 1996 the team sued the NFL in Santa Clara County, in a lawsuit that ultimately included 22 separate causes of action. Included in the team's claims were claims that the Tampa Bay Buccaneers' pirate logo diluted the team's California trademark in its own pirate logo and for trade dress dilution on the ground that the League had improperly permitted other teams (including the Buccaneers and Carolina Panthers) to adopt colors for their uniforms similar to those of the Raiders. Among other things, the lawsuit sought an injunction to prevent the Buccaneers and Panthers from wearing their uniforms while playing in California. In 2003 these claims were dismissed on summary judgment because the relief sought would violate the Commerce Clause of the United States Constitution.

==== BALCO scandal ====
In 2003 a number of current and former Oakland players such as Bill Romanowski, Tyrone Wheatley, Barret Robbins, Chris Cooper and Dana Stubblefield were named as clients of the Bay Area Laboratory Co-Operative (BALCO). BALCO was an American company led by founder and owner Victor Conte. Also in 2003, journalists Lance Williams and Mark Fainaru-Wada investigated the company's role in a drug sports scandal later referred to as the BALCO Affair. BALCO marketed tetrahydrogestrinone ("the Clear"), a then-undetected, performance-enhancing steroid developed by chemist Patrick Arnold. Conte, BALCO vice president James Valente, weight trainer Greg Anderson and coach Remi Korchemny had supplied a number of high-profile sports stars from the United States and Europe with the Clear and human growth hormone for several years.

Headquartered in Burlingame, BALCO was founded in 1984. Officially, BALCO was a service business for blood and urine analysis and food supplements. In 1988, Victor Conte offered free blood and urine tests to a group of athletes known as the BALCO Olympians. He then was allowed to attend the Summer Olympics in Seoul, South Korea. From 1996 Conte worked with well-known American football star Bill Romanowski, who proved to be useful to establish new connections to athletes and coaches.

== Players of note ==
=== Current roster ===
Las Vegas Raiders roster
**Quarterbacks (QB)**: 15 Fernando Mendoza; 12 Aidan O'Connell; **Running backs (RB)**: 34 Connor Heyward FB; 2 Ashton Jeanty; 23 Dylan Laube KR; 4 Mike Washington Jr.; **Wide receivers (WR)**: 18 Jack Bech; 19 Malik Benson PR; 9 Jalen Nailor; 10 Dont'e Thornton; 1 Tre Tucker; 82 Cody White; 81 Dareke Young; **Tight ends (TE)**: 89 Brock Bowers; 87 Michael Mayer; 80 Ian Thomas	**Offensive linemen (OL)**: 70 Spencer Burford G; 77 Bryce Cabeldue G; 71 DJ Glaze T; 60 Charles Grant T; 65 Tyler Linderbaum C; 74 Kolton Miller T; 58 Jackson Powers-Johnson G; 76 Caleb Rogers G; 66 Trey Zuhn III G; **Defensive linemen (DL)**: 99 Thomas Booker DT; 69 Adam Butler DT; 98 Maxx Crosby DE; 94 Folorunso Fatukasi DT; 97 Tonka Hemingway DT; 91 Tim Keenan III DT; 51 Malcolm Koonce DE; 95 Kwity Paye DE; 92 JJ Pegues DT	**Linebackers (LB)**: 17 Nakobe Dean; 44 Tommy Eichenberg; 55 Cody Lindenberg; 50 Segun Olubi; 7 Quay Walker; **Defensive backs (DB)**: 11 Jeremy Chinn S; 43 Dalton Johnson S; 3 Taron Johnson CB; 25 Darrell Luter Jr. CB; 35 Hezekiah Masses CB; 27 Tristin McCollum S; 28 Jermod McCoy CB; 20 Isaiah Pola-Mao S; 26 Darien Porter CB; 5 Eric Stokes CB; 31 Treydan Stukes S; **Special teams (ST)**: 6 AJ Cole P; 14 Matt Gay K; 47 Alex Ward LS	**Practice squad**: 90 Brandon Cleveland DT; 96 Anthony Goodlow DE; 45 Patrick Gurd TE; 37 Roman Hemby RB; 73 Niklas Henning T; 78 Amari Kight T; 38 Kansei Matsuzawa K (IPP); 57 Cameron McGrone LB; 52 Azeez Ojulari DE; 67 Will Putnam C; 84 Carter Runyon TE; 16 Brett Rypien QB; 48 Cian Slone DE; 83 Deven Thompkins WR; 22 Greedy Vance Jr. CB; 72 Chris Williams DT; 30 Owen Wright RB; **Reserve**: 29 Chigozie Anusiem CB (IR); 42 Keyron Crawford DE (IR); 54 Brennan Jackson LB (IR); 93 Patrick Johnson DE (IR); -- Justin Pickett G (IR) 53 active, 16 practice squad (1 IPP), 5 reserve As of November 16, 2026. Rookies in italics.; Roster; Depth chart; Transactions

=== Pro Football Hall of Fame members ===
The Pro Football Hall of Fame has inducted 17 players who made their primary contribution to professional football while with the Raiders, in addition to coach-owner-commissioner Al Davis, head coach John Madden, head coach Tom Flores and executive Ron Wolf. The Raiders' total is of 31 Hall of Famers.

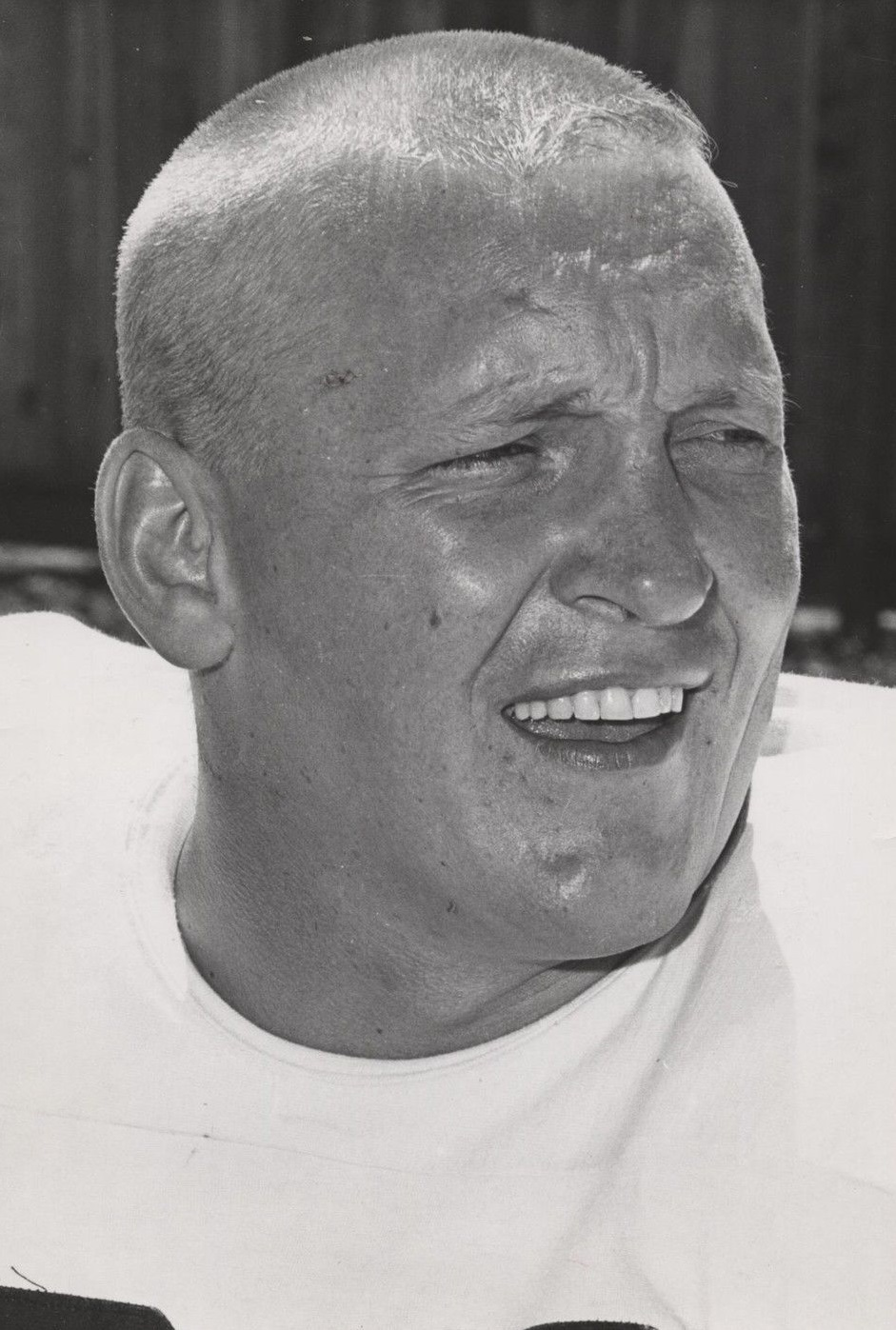
Hall of Fame C Jim Otto

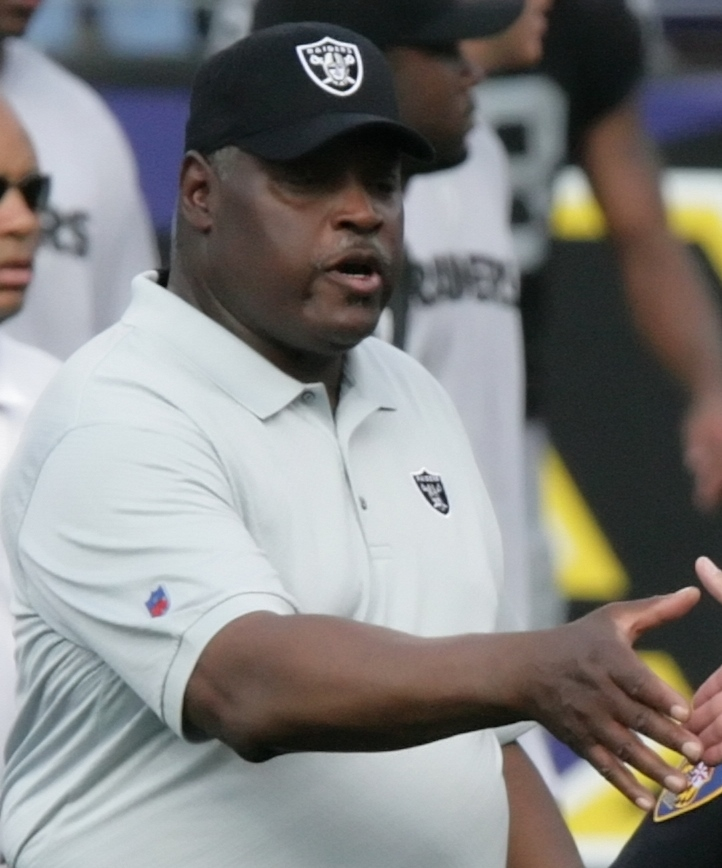
Raiders Hall of Famer Art Shell

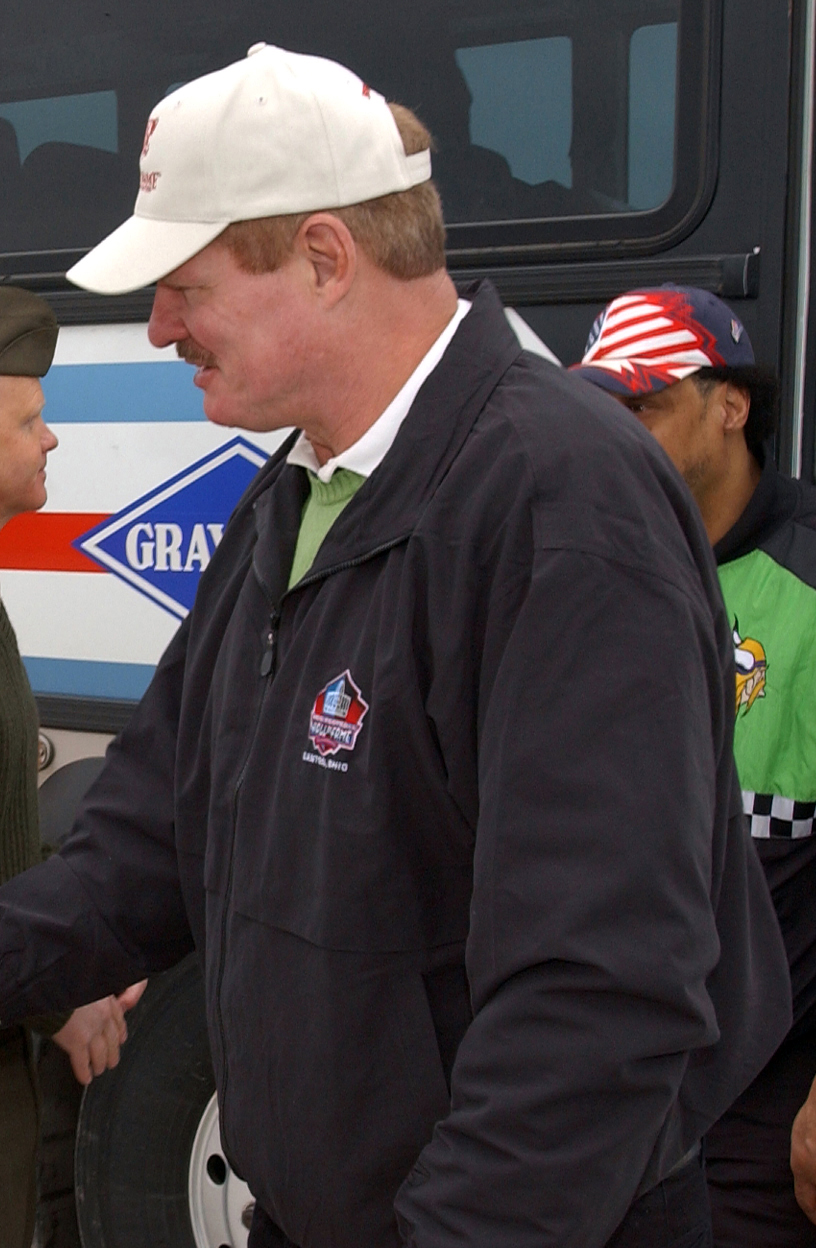
Ted Hendricks was a member of four Super Bowl-winning teams (three with the Raiders and one with the Colts).

Notes:

- Hall of Famers who made the major part of their primary contribution for the Raiders are listed in **bold**.
- Hall of Famers who spent only a minor portion of their career with the Raiders are listed in normal font.

Oakland / Los Angeles / Las Vegas Raiders in the Pro Football Hall of Fame
Players
No.	Name	Position(s)	Tenure	Inducted
77	Ron Mix	OT	1971	1979
00; 50	**Jim Otto**	C	1960–1974	1980
16	**George Blanda**	QB/K	1967–1975	1981
24	**Willie Brown**	CB; DB coach Director of Staff Development	1967–1978; 1979–1988; 1995–2019	1984
63	**Gene Upshaw**	G	1967–1981	1987
14; 25	**Fred Biletnikoff**	WR; WR coach	1965–1978; 1989–2006	1988
78	**Art Shell**	OT; OL coach Head coach	1968–1982; 1983–1989; 1989–1994, 2006	1989
83	**Ted Hendricks**	LB	1975–1983	1990
22	**Mike Haynes**	CB	1983–1989	1997
29	Eric Dickerson	RB	1992	1999
75	**Howie Long**	DE	1981–1993	2000
42	Ronnie Lott	S	1991–1992	2000
87	**Dave Casper**	TE	1974–1980, 1984	2002
32	**Marcus Allen**	RB	1982–1992	2003
80	James Lofton	WR; WR coach	1987–1988; 2008	2003
76	Bob Brown	OT	1971–1973	2004
26	Rod Woodson	S CB coach Assistant DB coach	2002–2003; 2011; 2015–2017	2009
80	Jerry Rice	WR	2001–2004	2010
99	Warren Sapp	DT	2004–2007	2013
8	**Ray Guy**	P	1973–1986	2014
81	**Tim Brown**	WR	1988–2003	2015
12	**Ken Stabler**	QB	1970–1979	2016
18	Randy Moss	WR	2005–2006	2018
24	**Charles Woodson**	CB	1998–2005; 2013–2015	2021
21	**Cliff Branch**	WR	1972–1985	2022
92	Richard Seymour	DE	2009–2012	2022
21	Eric Allen	CB	1998–2001	2025
22	Roger Craig	RB	1991	2026
Coaches and Contributors
Name		Position(s)	Tenure	Inducted
**Al Davis**		Coach-Owner-Commissioner	1963–2011	1992
**John Madden**		Head coach	1969–1978	2006
**Ron Wolf**		Scout; Player Personnel Director	1963–1974; 1979–1989	2015
**Tom Flores**		Head coach	1979–1987	2021

=== Retired numbers ===
The Raider organization does not retire the jersey numbers of former players on an official or unofficial basis. All 100 numbers are available for any player, regardless of stature or who previously wore the number.

=== Individual awards ===
**NFL MVP Winners**
Season	Player	Position
1974	Ken Stabler	QB
1985	Marcus Allen	RB
2002	Rich Gannon	QB

**Super Bowl MVP Winners**
Super Bowl	Player	Position
XI	Fred Biletnikoff	WR
XV	Jim Plunkett	QB
XVIII	Marcus Allen	RB

**Pro Bowl MVP Winners**
Pro Bowl	Player	Position
2001	Rich Gannon	QB
2002	Rich Gannon	QB
2022	Maxx Crosby	DE

**NFL Offensive Player of the Year**
Season	Player	Position
1974	Ken Stabler	QB
1985	Marcus Allen	RB

**NFL Defensive Player of the Year**
Season	Player	Position
1980	Lester Hayes	CB
2016	Khalil Mack	LB

**NFL Comeback Player of the Year**
Season	Player	Position
1980	Jim Plunkett	QB
1982	Lyle Alzado	DE

**NFL Offensive Rookie of the Year**
Season	Player	Position
1982	Marcus Allen	RB

**NFL Defensive Rookie of the Year**
Season	Player	Position
1998	Charles Woodson	CB

**Walter Payton NFL Man of the Year**
Season	Player	Position
1974	George Blanda	QB/K

**Byron "Whizzer" White Man of the Year**
Season	Player	Position
1979	Gene Upshaw	G
2009	Nnamdi Asomugha	CB

=== Career leaders ===
- Passing yards: 35,222 Derek Carr (2014–2022)
- Pass completions: 3,201 Derek Carr (2014–2022)
- Passing touchdowns: 217 Derek Carr (2014–2022)
- Rushing yards: 8,545 Marcus Allen (1982–1992)
- Rushing touchdowns: 79 Marcus Allen (1982–1992)
- Receptions: 1,070 Tim Brown (1988–2003)
- Receiving yards: 14,734 Tim Brown (1988–2003)
- Receiving touchdowns: 99 Tim Brown (1988–2003)
- Total touchdowns: 104 Tim Brown (1988–2003)
- Points: 1,799 Sebastian Janikowski (2000–2016)
- Field goals made: 414 Sebastian Janikowski (2000–2016)
- Total punt yardage: 48,215 Shane Lechler (2000–2012)
- Punting average: 47.5 Shane Lechler (2000–2012)
- Kickoff return yards: 4,841 Chris Carr (2005–2007)
- Punt Return yards: 3,272 Tim Brown (1988–2003)
- Pass interceptions: 39 Willie Brown (1967–1978), Lester Hayes (1977–1986)
- Pass deflections: 84 Charles Woodson (1998–2015)
- Sacks: 107.5 Greg Townsend (1983–1997)
- Forced fumbles: 18 Charles Woodson (1998–2015)
- Winningest coach: 103 John Madden (1969–1978)

=== Single season leaders ===
- Passing yards: 4,804 Derek Carr (2021)
- Passing touchdowns: 34 Daryle Lamonica (1969)
- Rushing yards: 1,759 Marcus Allen (1985)
- Rushing touchdowns: 16 Pete Banaszak (1975)
- Receptions: 112 Brock Bowers (2024)
- Receiving yards: 1,516 Davante Adams (2022)
- Receiving touchdowns: 16 Art Powell (1963)
- Total touchdowns: 18 Marcus Allen (1984)
- Points: 150 Daniel Carlson (2021)
- Field goals made: 40 Daniel Carlson (2021)
- Total punt yardage: 4,930 Marquette King (2014)
- Punting average: 51.1 Shane Lechler (2009)
- Kickoff return yards: 1,762 Chris Carr (2006)
- Punt return yards: 692 Fulton Walker (1985)
- Pass interceptions: 13 Lester Hayes (1980)
- Sacks: 16.0 Derrick Burgess (2005)

=== All-Pro selections ===
The following Raiders players have been named to the All-Pro team:

- **QB** Daryle Lamonica, Ken Stabler, Rich Gannon (2)
- **RB** Clem Daniels (4), Marcus Allen (3), Josh Jacobs (1)
- **FB** Hewritt Dixon, Marcel Reece (1)
- **WR** Cliff Branch (3), Tim Brown, Fred Biletnikoff (2), Art Powell, Davante Adams (1)
- **TE** Dave Casper, Todd Christensen (4), Billy Cannon (2)
- **OT** Art Shell (4), Harry Schuh, Lincoln Kennedy (2)
- **G** Gene Upshaw (5), Steve Wisniewski (2), Kelechi Osemele (1)
- **C** Jim Otto (10), Barret Robbins (1)
- **DE** Howie Long, Khalil Mack (2), Ben Davidson (1)
- **DT** Tom Keating, Dan Birdwell, Bill Pickel, Chester McGlockton, Darrell Russell (1)
- **LB** Ted Hendricks (3), Rod Martin, Archie Matsos, Khalil Mack (1)
- **CB** Willie Brown, Nnamdi Asomugha (4), Dave Grayson, Charles Woodson (3), Fred Williamson, Kent McCloughan, Mike Haynes (2), Lester Hayes (1)
- **S** Tom Morrow, Ronnie Lott, Rod Woodson, Charles Woodson (1)
- **K** Jeff Jaeger (1)
- **P** Shane Lechler (6), Ray Guy (3), Jeff Gossett, A. J. Cole III (1)

=== Pro Bowl selections ===
The following Raiders players have been named to the Pro Bowl:

- **QB** Daryle Lamonica, Ken Stabler, Rich Gannon, Derek Carr (4), Cotton Davidson, Tom Flores, George Blanda, Jeff Hostetler (1)
- **RB** Marcus Allen (5), Clem Daniels (4), Marv Hubbard (3), Josh Jacobs (2), Kenny King, Greg Pruitt, Bo Jackson, Latavius Murray (1)
- **FB** Hewritt Dixon (4), Marcel Reece (4), Alan Miller (1)
- **WR** Tim Brown (9), Fred Biletnikoff (6), Art Powell, Cliff Branch (4), Warren Wells, Amari Cooper (2), Jerry Rice, Hunter Renfrow, Davante Adams (1)
- **TE** Dave Casper, Todd Christensen (5), Raymond Chester (4), Billy Cannon, Ethan Horton, Zach Miller, Jared Cook, Darren Waller, Brock Bowers (1)
- **OT** Art Shell (8), Harry Schuh, Lincoln Kennedy (3), Henry Lawrence, Donald Penn (2), Bob Brown (1)
- **G** Steve Wisniewski (8), Gene Upshaw (7), Wayne Hawkins (5), Kelechi Osemele (2), Max Montoya, Kevin Gogan (1)
- **C** Jim Otto (12), Don Mosebar (3), Rodney Hudson (2), Dave Dalby, Barret Robbins (1)
- **DE** Howie Long (8), Maxx Crosby (4), Ben Davidson, Khalil Mack, (3), Greg Townsend, Derrick Burgess (2), Ike Lassiter (1)
- **DT** Chester McGlockton (4), Tom Keating, Darrell Russell, Richard Seymour (2), Dave Costa, Dan Birdwell, Otis Sistrunk (1)
- **LB** Phil Villapiano, Ted Hendricks (4), Dan Conners (3), Rod Martin (2), Archie Matsos, Gus Otto, Matt Millen, Denzel Perryman (1)
- **CB** Willie Brown (7), Lester Hayes, Terry McDaniel (5), Charles Woodson (4), Fred Williamson, Dave Grayson, Mike Haynes, Nnamdi Asomugha (3), Kent McCloughan (2)
- **S** Jack Tatum (3), George Atkinson, Vann McElroy (2), Ronnie Lott, Rod Woodson, Charles Woodson, Reggie Nelson (1)
- **K** Jeff Jaeger, Sebastian Janikowski (1)
- **P** Ray Guy, Shane Lechler (7), A. J. Cole III (3), Jeff Gossett (1)
- **LS** Jon Condo (2)

== Front office and coaching staff ==
=== Coaches/executives ===
The coaches and executives that have contributed to the history & success of the Los Angeles/Oakland/Las Vegas Raiders franchise are as follows:

- Al Davis: head coach (1963–1965), general manager/owner (1966–2011), AFL commissioner (1966)
- Ron Wolf: scout/executive, director of player personnel (1963–1974, 1978–1989)
- John Rauch: head coach (1965–1968)
- John Herrera: business & public relations (1967–1978), director of public relations (1978–1982), senior executive (1985–2012)
- John Madden: head coach (1969–1978)
- Al LoCasale: executive assistant (1969–2003)
- Ken Herock: scout/executive assistant, scout/personnel director (1970–1975), player personnel (1984–1986), executive assistant (1997–1998)
- Tom Flores: assistant head coach, executive assistant coach (1972–1978), head coach (1979–1987), executive (1988)
- Art Shell: assistant head coach (1983–1989), head coach (1989–1994, 2006)
- Amy Trask: chief executive officer (1987–2013)
- Bruce Allen: senior executive (1995–2003)
- Jon Gruden: head coach (1998–2001, 2018–2021)
- Reggie McKenzie: general manager (2012–2018)
- Marc Badain: president (2013–2021)
- Jack Del Rio: president (2015–2017)
- Sandra Douglass Morgan: president (2022–present)

=== Current staff ===
Las Vegas Raiders staff
Front office: Owner – Mark Davis; President – Sandra Douglass Morgan; General manager – John Spytek; Assistant general manager – Brian Stark; Senior vice president/director of football administration – Tom Delaney; Senior vice president of football operations and strategy – Mark Thewes; Senior personnel executive – Anthony Patch; VP, player personnel – Brandon Hunt; VP, football research and development – David Christoff; Director of football strategy – Kunal Singh; Director of football systems – Brad Goldsberry; Director of college scouting – Brandon Yeargan; Assistant director of college scouting – Johnathon Stigall; Director of pro scouting – Ben Chester; Senior national scout – Andy Dengler; Senior national scout – Lenny McGill; Head coaches: Head coach – Klint Kubiak; Assistant head coach – Mike McCoy; Offensive coaches: Offensive coordinator – Andrew Janocko; Quarterbacks – Mike Sullivan; Offensive pass game coordinator – Nick Holz; Offensive run game coordinator – Mario Jeberaeel; Running backs – Omar Young; Wide receivers – Zach Azzanni; Tight ends – Luke Steckel; Offensive line – Rick Dennison; Assistant offensive line – Ben Wilkerson; Offensive assistant – Tim Zetts; Offensive quality control – Pete Collins; Offensive quality control – Conner McQueen; Offensive quality control – Torrey Gill	Defensive coaches: Defensive coordinator – Rob Leonard; Senior defensive assistant – Al Holcomb; Defensive line – Travis Smith; Assistant defensive line – Kenyon Jackson; Linebackers – Ronell Williams; Defensive pass game coordinator/defensive backs – Joe Woods; Safeties – Matt Robinson; Defensive assistant – Steve Ferentz; Defensive quality control – Drew Gaither; Defensive quality control – Cody Grimm; Defensive quality control – Ketner Kupp; Special teams coaches: Special teams coordinator – Joe DeCamillis; Senior special teams assistant – Marquice Williams; Assistant special teams – Tim McConnell; Coaching operations: SVP - coaching operations – Matt Capurro; Director of special projects and game management – Rohit Mogalayapalli; Strength and conditioning: Head strength and conditioning – A. J. Neibel; Assistant head strength and conditioning – Rick Slate; Assistant strength and conditioning – Matthew Fyle; Assistant strength and conditioning – Haley Roberts; Assistant strength and conditioning – Tevin Duncan; Wellness coordinator – Alex Guerrero; → Coaching staff → Front office → More NFL staffs

== See also ==
- Sports in the Las Vegas metropolitan area

Preceded by Kansas City Chiefs	AFL champions Oakland Raiders; 1967	Succeeded by New York Jets
Preceded by Pittsburgh Steelers	Super Bowl champions Oakland Raiders; 1976 (XI)	Succeeded by Dallas Cowboys
Preceded by Pittsburgh Steelers	Super Bowl champions Oakland Raiders; 1980 (XV)	Succeeded by San Francisco 49ers
Preceded by Washington Redskins	Super Bowl champions Los Angeles Raiders; 1983 (XVIII)	Succeeded by San Francisco 49ers
