= 2026 Las Vegas Raiders season =

67th season in franchise history; 57th season in the NFL

- Owner: Mark Davis
- General manager: John Spytek
- President: Sandra Douglass Morgan
- Head coach: Klint Kubiak
- Offensive coordinator: Andrew Janocko
- Defensive coordinator: Rob Leonard
- Home stadium: Allegiant Stadium

Results
- Record: 4–6
- Division place: 3rd AFC West

Uniform
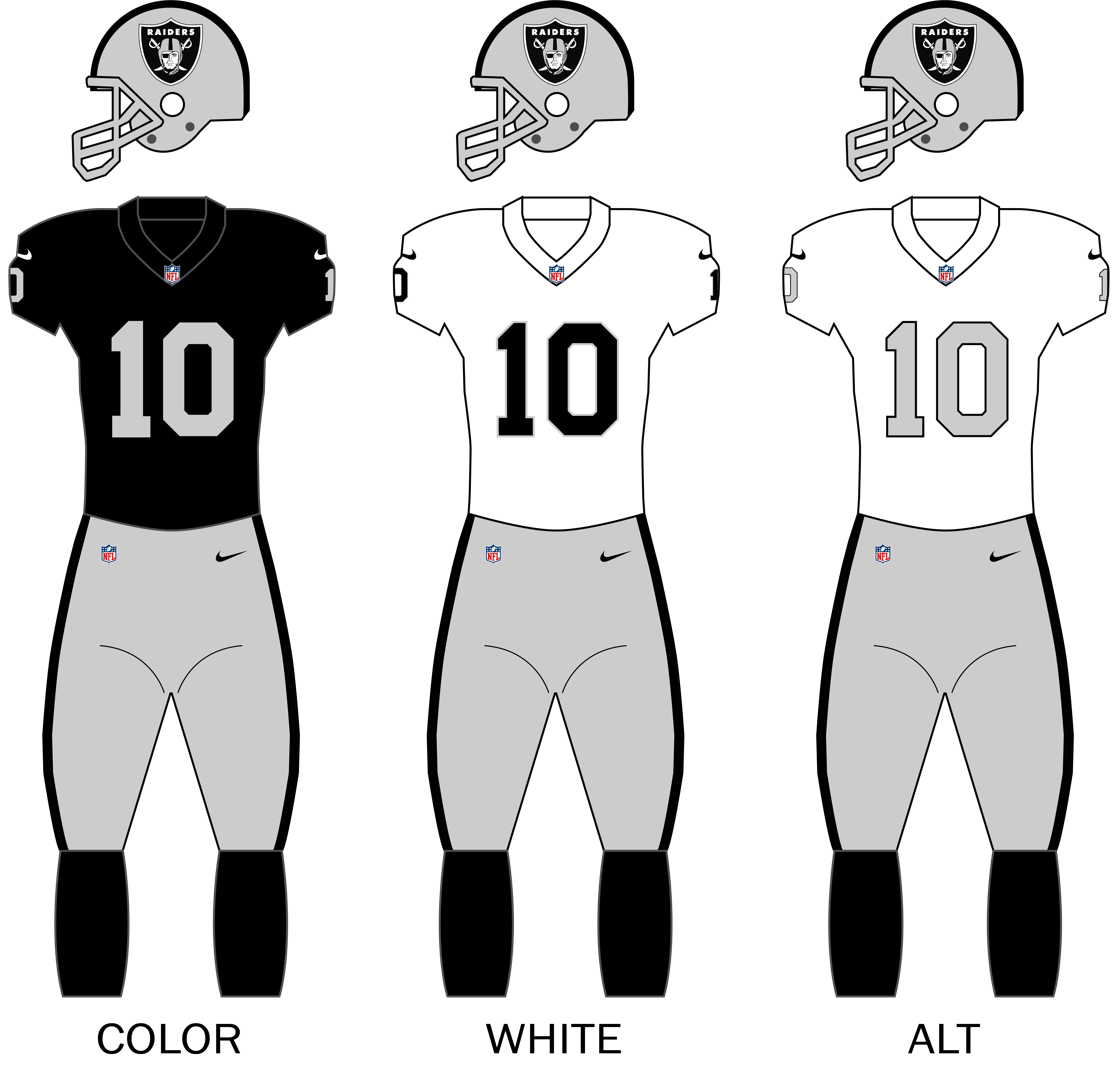

The 2026 season is the Las Vegas Raiders' 57th in the National Football League (NFL), their 67th overall, their seventh in Las Vegas, their second under general manager John Spytek and their first season under head coach Klint Kubiak. The Raiders improved from their 3–14 record from 2025, recording their first 3–0 start since 2021, but would lose 6 out of their next 7. They will attempt to make the playoffs after a four-year absence, end their 23-year AFC West title drought, and put an end to two consecutive seasons with fewer than five wins. This season began with the team's sixth head coach since 2021. It also began with the team's fifth opening day starting quarterback in as many seasons.

== Offseason ==
=== Coaching changes ===
Following the end of the 2025 season, the Raiders fired head coach Pete Carroll after only one season. The team has said that the search for a new hire would be led by GM John Spytek and minority owner Tom Brady. Defensive coordinator Patrick Graham's contract was not renewed and he left to become the defensive coordinator of the Pittsburgh Steelers.

On February 9, 2026, the team named Seattle Seahawks offensive coordinator Klint Kubiak the team's new head coach. Former San Diego Chargers' head coach Mike McCoy was named assistant head coach. Kubiak named Seahawks' quarterback coach Andrew Janocko as the team's new offensive coordinator. Defensive line and run game coordinator Rob Leonard was promoted to defensive coordinator.

=== Signings ===
Position	Player	Tag	Previous team	Date signed	Notes
LB	Nakobe Dean	UFA	Philadelphia Eagles	March 11	3 years, $36 million
K	Matt Gay	UFA	San Francisco 49ers	March 11	1 year, $1.6 million
C	Tyler Linderbaum	UFA	Baltimore Ravens	March 12	3 years, $81 million
WR	Jalen Nailor	UFA	Minnesota Vikings	March 12	3 years, $35 million
DE	Kwity Paye	UFA	Indianapolis Colts	March 12	3 years, $48 million
LB	Quay Walker	UFA	Green Bay Packers	March 12	4 years, $40.5 million
QB	Kirk Cousins	UFA	Atlanta Falcons	April 6	5 years, $172 million

=== Trades ===
Trades below are only for trades that included a player. Draft pick-only trades will go in the draft section.

Date	Player(s)/Asset(s) received	Team	Player(s)/Asset(s) traded	Source
March 11	CB Taron Johnson, 2026 7th round selection (No. 228)	Buffalo Bills	2026 6th round selection (No. 182)	
March 11	2026 6th round selection (No. 208)	New York Jets	QB Geno Smith, 2026 7th round selection (No. 228)	
November 10	2027 3rd round selection	Minnesota Vikings	QB Kirk Cousins	

=== Draft ===
The Raiders held the first overall pick in the draft for the first time since 2007, when they were based in Oakland.

2026 Las Vegas Raiders draft selections
Round	Selection	Player	Position	College	Notes
1	1	Fernando Mendoza	QB	Indiana	
2	36	Traded to the Houston Texans			
2	38	Treydan Stukes	S	Arizona	From Commanders via Texans
3	67	Keyron Crawford	DE	Auburn	
3	91	Trey Zuhn III	G	Texas A&M	From Bills via Texans
4	101	Jermod McCoy	CB	Tennessee	From Tennessee via Buffalo
4	117	Traded to the Houston Texans			From Vikings via Jaguars (Note: The Raiders traded WR Jakobi Meyers to Jacksonville in exchange for a fourth-round selection and a sixth-round selection.)
4	122	Mike Washington Jr.	RB	Arkansas	From Eagles via Falcons
4	134	Traded to the Atlanta Falcons			Compensatory selection
5	141	Traded to the Cleveland Browns			
5	150	Dalton Johnson	S	Arizona	From New Orleans
5	175	Hezekiah Masses	CB	California	Compensatory selection
6	182	Traded to the Buffalo Bills			From Jets via Browns and Jaguars
6	185	Traded to the Tampa Bay Buccaneers			
6	195	Malik Benson	WR	Oregon	From Buccaneers
6	208	Traded to the Atlanta Falcons			From Bills via Jets
7	219	Traded to the New Orleans Saints			
7	229	Brandon Cleveland	DT	NC State	From Buccaneers

2026 Las Vegas Raiders undrafted free agents
Name	Position	College	Ref.
Jacob Clark	QB	Missouri State	
Tyler Duzansky	LS	Penn State	
Roman Hemby	RB	Indiana	
Isaiah Jatta	T	BYU	
Devin Lafayette	S	Troy	
Matt Lauter	TE	Boise State	
Kansei Matsuzawa	K	Hawaii	
Caleb Offord	CB	Kennesaw State	
Justin Pickett	G	Duke	
Chase Roberts	WR	BYU	
Corey Rucker	WR	Arkansas State	
Cian Slone	DE	NC State	
Gary Smith III	DT	UCLA	
Xavian Sorey Jr.	LB	Arkansas	
Chris Thomas	LB	Maine	
Tanner Wall	S	BYU	
E.J. Williams Jr.	WR	Indiana	
Devyn Perkins	S	Utah Tech	
Niklas Henning	T	Queen's (Canada)	
Patrick Gurd	TE	Cincinnati	
Kamar Missouri	T	UTSA	
Jonathan Brady	WR	Indiana	

Draft trades

== Staff ==
Las Vegas Raiders staff
Front office: Owner – Mark Davis; President – Sandra Douglass Morgan; General manager – John Spytek; Assistant general manager – Brian Stark; Senior vice president/director of football administration – Tom Delaney; Senior vice president of football operations and strategy – Mark Thewes; Senior personnel executive – Anthony Patch; VP, player personnel – Brandon Hunt; VP, football research and development – David Christoff; Director of football strategy – Kunal Singh; Director of football systems – Brad Goldsberry; Director of college scouting – Brandon Yeargan; Assistant director of college scouting – Johnathon Stigall; Director of pro scouting – Ben Chester; Senior national scout – Andy Dengler; Senior national scout – Lenny McGill; Head coaches: Head coach – Klint Kubiak; Assistant head coach – Mike McCoy; Offensive coaches: Offensive coordinator – Andrew Janocko; Quarterbacks – Mike Sullivan; Offensive pass game coordinator – Nick Holz; Offensive run game coordinator – Mario Jeberaeel; Running backs – Omar Young; Wide receivers – Zach Azzanni; Tight ends – Luke Steckel; Offensive line – Rick Dennison; Assistant offensive line – Ben Wilkerson; Offensive assistant – Tim Zetts; Offensive quality control – Pete Collins; Offensive quality control – Conner McQueen; Offensive quality control – Torrey Gill	Defensive coaches: Defensive coordinator – Rob Leonard; Senior defensive assistant – Al Holcomb; Defensive line – Travis Smith; Assistant defensive line – Kenyon Jackson; Linebackers – Ronell Williams; Defensive pass game coordinator/defensive backs – Joe Woods; Safeties – Matt Robinson; Defensive assistant – Steve Ferentz; Defensive quality control – Drew Gaither; Defensive quality control – Cody Grimm; Defensive quality control – Ketner Kupp; Special teams coaches: Special teams coordinator – Joe DeCamillis; Senior special teams assistant – Marquice Williams; Assistant special teams – Tim McConnell; Coaching operations: SVP - coaching operations – Matt Capurro; Director of special projects and game management – Rohit Mogalayapalli; Strength and conditioning: Head strength and conditioning – A. J. Neibel; Assistant head strength and conditioning – Rick Slate; Assistant strength and conditioning – Matthew Fyle; Assistant strength and conditioning – Haley Roberts; Assistant strength and conditioning – Tevin Duncan; Wellness coordinator – Alex Guerrero; → Coaching staff → Front office → More NFL staffs

== Current roster ==
Las Vegas Raiders roster
Quarterbacks (QB): 15 Fernando Mendoza; 12 Aidan O'Connell; Running backs (RB): 34 Connor Heyward FB; 2 Ashton Jeanty; 23 Dylan Laube KR; 4 Mike Washington Jr.; Wide receivers (WR): 18 Jack Bech; 19 Malik Benson PR; 9 Jalen Nailor; 10 Dont'e Thornton; 1 Tre Tucker; 82 Cody White; 81 Dareke Young; Tight ends (TE): 89 Brock Bowers; 87 Michael Mayer; 80 Ian Thomas	Offensive linemen (OL): 70 Spencer Burford G; 77 Bryce Cabeldue G; 71 DJ Glaze T; 60 Charles Grant T; 65 Tyler Linderbaum C; 74 Kolton Miller T; 58 Jackson Powers-Johnson G; 76 Caleb Rogers G; 66 Trey Zuhn III G; Defensive linemen (DL): 99 Thomas Booker DT; 69 Adam Butler DT; 98 Maxx Crosby DE; 94 Folorunso Fatukasi DT; 97 Tonka Hemingway DT; 91 Tim Keenan III DT; 51 Malcolm Koonce DE; 95 Kwity Paye DE; 92 JJ Pegues DT	Linebackers (LB): 17 Nakobe Dean; 44 Tommy Eichenberg; 55 Cody Lindenberg; 50 Segun Olubi; 7 Quay Walker; Defensive backs (DB): 11 Jeremy Chinn S; 43 Dalton Johnson S; 3 Taron Johnson CB; 25 Darrell Luter Jr. CB; 35 Hezekiah Masses CB; 27 Tristin McCollum S; 28 Jermod McCoy CB; 20 Isaiah Pola-Mao S; 26 Darien Porter CB; 5 Eric Stokes CB; 31 Treydan Stukes S; Special teams (ST): 6 AJ Cole P; 14 Matt Gay K; 47 Alex Ward LS	Practice squad: 90 Brandon Cleveland DT; 96 Anthony Goodlow DE; 45 Patrick Gurd TE; 37 Roman Hemby RB; 73 Niklas Henning T; 78 Amari Kight T; 38 Kansei Matsuzawa K (IPP); 57 Cameron McGrone LB; 52 Azeez Ojulari DE; 67 Will Putnam C; 84 Carter Runyon TE; 16 Brett Rypien QB; 48 Cian Slone DE; 83 Deven Thompkins WR; 22 Greedy Vance Jr. CB; 72 Chris Williams DT; 30 Owen Wright RB; Reserve: 29 Chigozie Anusiem CB (IR); 42 Keyron Crawford DE (IR); 54 Brennan Jackson LB (IR); 93 Patrick Johnson DE (IR); -- Justin Pickett G (IR) 53 active, 16 practice squad (1 IPP), 5 reserve As of November 16, 2026. Rookies in italics.; Roster; Depth chart; Transactions

== Preseason ==
Week	Date	Opponent	Result	Record	Venue	Recap
1	August 13	Arizona Cardinals	L 14–27	0–1	Allegiant Stadium	Recap
2	August 20	at Houston Texans	W 22–20	1–1	Reliant Stadium	Recap
3	August 27	San Francisco 49ers	L 12–18	1–2	Allegiant Stadium	Recap

== Regular season ==
=== Schedule ===
Week	Date	Time (PT)	Opponent	Result	Record	Venue	Network	Recap
1	September 13	1:25 p.m.	Miami Dolphins	**W** 27–13	1–0	Allegiant Stadium	Fox	Recap
2	September 20	1:05 p.m.	at **Los Angeles Chargers**	**W** 26–14	2–0	SoFi Stadium	CBS	Recap
3	September 27	1:25 p.m.	at New Orleans Saints	**W** 35–27	3–0	Caesars Superdome	CBS	Recap
4	October 4	1:25 p.m.	**Kansas City Chiefs**	**L** 27–30	3–1	Allegiant Stadium	CBS	Recap
5	October 11	10:00 a.m.	at New England Patriots	**L** 17–45	3–2	Gillette Stadium	CBS	Recap
6	October 18	1:25 p.m.	Buffalo Bills	**L** 30–33	3–3	Allegiant Stadium	CBS	Recap
7	October 25	1:25 p.m.	Los Angeles Rams	**L** 21–35	3–4	Allegiant Stadium	Fox	Recap
8	November 1	10:00 a.m.	at New York Jets	**W** 38–33	4–4	MetLife Stadium	Fox	Recap
9	November 8	1:25 p.m.	at San Francisco 49ers	**L** 17–38	4–5	Levi's Stadium	Fox	Recap
10	November 15	1:05 p.m.	Seattle Seahawks	**L** 13–21	4–6	Allegiant Stadium	CBS	Recap
11	November 22	1:25 p.m.	at **Denver Broncos**			Empower Field at Mile High	CBS	
12	November 29	5:20 p.m.	at Cleveland Browns			Huntington Bank Field	NBC	
13	Bye							
14	December 13	1:05 p.m.	**Los Angeles Chargers**			Allegiant Stadium	CBS	
15	December 20	1:25 p.m.	**Denver Broncos**			Allegiant Stadium	CBS	
16	December 27	1:05 p.m.	Tennessee Titans			Allegiant Stadium	Fox	
17	January 3	1:05 p.m.	at Arizona Cardinals			State Farm Stadium	CBS	
18	January 9/10	TBD	at **Kansas City Chiefs**			Arrowhead Stadium	TBD	

Notes

- Intra-division opponents are in **bold** text.
- Networks, dates and times from Weeks 14–17 are subject to change as a result of flexible scheduling.
- The date, time and network for Week 18 will be finalized at the end of Week 17.

=== Game summaries ===
==== Week 1: vs. Miami Dolphins ====
Week 1: Miami Dolphins at Las Vegas Raiders – Game summary

Quarter	1	2	3	4	Total
Dolphins	0	6	7	0	**13**
**Raiders**	7	10	10	0	**27**

at Allegiant Stadium, Paradise, Nevada

- Date: September 13
- Game time: 1:25 p.m. PDT
- Game weather: None (indoor stadium)
- Game attendance: 62,541
- Referee: Clete Blakeman
- TV announcers (Fox): Chris Myers, Mark Schlereth and Jen Hale
- Recap, Game Book

Game information

**First quarter**

- LV – Jack Bech 15-yard pass from Kirk Cousins (Matt Gay kick), 1:33. Raiders 7–0. **Drive: 16 plays, 93 yards, 8:58.**

**Second quarter**

- LV – Matt Gay 47-yard field goal, 10:22. Raiders 10–0. **Drive: 9 plays, 38 yards, 3:46.**
- MIA – Riley Patterson 41-yard field goal, 4:08. Raiders 10–3. **Drive: 10 plays, 42 yards, 6:14.**
- LV – Ashton Jeanty 13-yard pass from Kirk Cousins (Matt Gay kick), 1:07. Raiders 17–3. **Drive: 7 plays, 54 yards, 3:01.**
- MIA – Riley Patterson 37-yard field goal, 0:00. Raiders 17–6. **Drive: 6 plays, 51 yards, 1:07.**

**Third quarter**

- MIA – Malik Willis 14-yard run (Riley Patterson kick), 12:44. Raiders 17–13. **Drive: 4 plays, 52 yards, 1:45.**
- LV – Ashton Jeanty 13-yard pass from Kirk Cousins (Matt Gay kick), 9:58. Raiders 24–13. **Drive: 5 plays, 50 yards, 2:46.**
- LV – Matt Gay 30-yard field goal, 2:34. Raiders 27–13. **Drive: 13 plays, 54 yards, 7:07.**

**Fourth quarter**

- No scoring plays

**Top passers**

- MIA – Malik Willis – 15/27, 220 yards, INT
- LV – Kirk Cousins – 21/30, 160 yards, 3 TD, 2 INT

**Top rushers**

- MIA – Malik Willis – 6 rushes, 39 yards, TD
- LV – Ashton Jeanty – 23 rushes, 102 yards

**Top receivers**

- MIA – Caleb Douglas – 5 receptions, 94 yards
- LV – Ashton Jeanty – 6 receptions, 45 yards, 2 TD

==== Week 2: at Los Angeles Chargers ====
Week 2: Las Vegas Raiders at Los Angeles Chargers – Game summary

Quarter	1	2	3	4	Total
**Raiders**	0	10	7	9	**26**
Chargers	0	7	7	0	**14**

at SoFi Stadium, Inglewood, California

- Date: September 20
- Game time: 1:05 p.m. PDT
- Game weather: Mostly sunny, 75 °F (24 °C) (fixed roof)
- Game attendance: 71,567
- Referee: Bill Vinovich
- TV announcers (CBS): Andrew Catalon, Logan Ryan and AJ Ross
- Recap, Game Book

Game information

**First quarter**

- No scoring plays

**Second quarter**

- LV – Tre Tucker 40-yard pass from Kirk Cousins (Matt Gay kick), 11:51. Raiders 7–0. **Drive: 3 plays, 51 yards, 1:22.**
- LAC – Omarion Hampton 1-yard run (Cameron Dicker kick), 5:26. Tied 7–7. **Drive: 10 plays, 69 yards, 6:25.**
- LV – Matt Gay 59-yard field goal, 0:04. Raiders 10–7. **Drive: 6 plays, 43 yards, 0:31.**

**Third quarter**

- LAC – Oronde Gadsden II 10-yard pass from Justin Herbert (Cameron Dicker kick), 9:49. Chargers 14–10. **Drive: 7 plays, 74 yards, 4:07.**
- LV – Cody White 13-yard pass from Kirk Cousins (Matt Gay kick), 3:53. Raiders 17–14. **Drive: 711 plays, 74 yards, 5:56.**

**Fourth quarter**

- LV – Cody White 11-yard pass from Kirk Cousins (Matt Gay kick), 2:59. Raiders 24–14. **Drive: 3 plays, 16 yards, 0:43.**
- LV – Penalty on Joe Alt enforced in the end zone for a safety, 1:41. Raiders 26–14.

**Top passers**

- LV – Kirk Cousins – 19/29, 253 yards, 3 TD, INT
- LAC – Justin Herbert – 15/27, 192 yards, TD, 2 INT

**Top rushers**

- LV – Ashton Jeanty – 21 rushes, 48 yards
- LAC – Omarion Hampton – 23 rushes, 94 yards, TD

**Top receivers**

- LV – Tre Tucker – 5 receptions, 119 yards, TD
- LAC – Tre Harris – 1 reception, 53 yards

With the upset win, the Raiders broke their four-game losing streak against the Chargers. They improved to 2–0 for the first time since 2021.

==== Week 3: at New Orleans Saints ====
Week 3: Las Vegas Raiders at New Orleans Saints – Game summary

Quarter	1	2	3	4	Total
**Raiders**	3	13	6	13	**35**
Saints	6	7	14	0	**27**

at Caesars Superdome, New Orleans, Louisiana

- Date: September 27
- Game time: 3:25 p.m. CDT/1:25 p.m. PDT
- Game weather: None (indoor stadium)
- Game attendance: 70,006
- Referee: Adrian Hill
- TV announcers (CBS): Chris Lewis, Luke Kuechly and Amanda Balionis
- Recap, Game Book

Game information

**First quarter**

- LV – Matt Gay 41-yard field goal, 7:35. Raiders 3–0. **Drive: 12 plays, 53 yards, 6:32.**
- NO – Juwan Johnson 2-yard pass from Tyler Shough (kick blocked), 0:50. Saints 6–3. **Drive: 13 plays, 79 yards, 6:45.**

**Second quarter**

- LV – Matt Gay 37-yard field goal, 11:27. Tied 6–6. **Drive: 9 plays, 42 yards, 4:23.**
- LV – Michael Mayer 3-yard pass from Kirk Cousins (Matt Gay kick), 5:46. Raiders 13–6. **Drive: 8 plays, 53 yards, 3:45.**
- NO – Noah Fant 3-yard pass from Tyler Shough (Daniel Carlson kick), 1:54. Tied 13–13. **Drive: 10 plays, 72 yards, 3:52.**
- LV – Matt Gay 25-yard field goal, 0:00. Raiders 16–13. **Drive: 11 plays, 58 yards, 1:54.**

**Third quarter**

- NO – Juwan Johnson 1-yard pass from Tyler Shough (Daniel Carlson kick), 6:40. Saints 20–16. **Drive: 12 plays, 87 yards, 6:50.**
- NO – Noah Fant 16-yard pass from Tyler Shough (Daniel Carlson kick), 5:46. Saints 27–16. **Drive: 2 plays, 32 yards, 0:47.**
- LV – Mike Washington Jr. 36-yard run (pass failed), 3:20. Saints 27–22. **Drive: 5 plays, 71 yards, 2:26.**

**Fourth quarter**

- LV – Cody White 4-yard pass from Kirk Cousins (pass failed), 9:21. Raiders 28–27. **Drive: 6 plays, 55 yards, 3:34.**
- LV – Brock Bowers 4-yard pass from Kirk Cousins (Matt Gay kick), 6:22. Raiders 35–27. **Drive: 3 plays, 4 yards, 1:26.**

**Top passers**

- LV – Kirk Cousins – 22/33, 248 yards, 3 TD
- NO – Tyler Shough – 29/42, 255 yards, 4 TD, INT

**Top rushers**

- LV – Ashton Jeanty – 19 rushes, 56 yards
- NO – Travis Etienne – 13 rushes, 57 yards

**Top receivers**

- LV – Brock Bowers – 10 receptions, 116 yards, TD
- NO – Chris Olave – 9 receptions, 107 yards

With the win, the Raiders secured their first 3–0 start since 2021.

==== Week 4: vs. Kansas City Chiefs ====
Week 4: Kansas City Chiefs at Las Vegas Raiders – Game summary

Quarter	1	2	3	4	Total
**Chiefs**	7	3	0	20	**30**
Raiders	7	6	0	14	**27**

at Allegiant Stadium, Paradise, Nevada

- Date: October 4
- Game time: 1:25 p.m. PDT
- Game weather: None (indoor stadium)
- Game attendance: 62,593
- Referee: Brad Rogers
- TV announcers (CBS): Jim Nantz, J.J. Watt, Tracy Wolfson
- Recap, Game Book

Game information

**First quarter**

- LV – Ian Thomas 27-yard pass from Kirk Cousins (Matt Gay kick), 8:10. Raiders 7–0. **Drive: 4 plays, 50 yards, 2:16.**
- KC – Tyquan Thornton 2-yard pass from Patrick Mahomes (Harrison Butker kick), 2:23. Tied 7–7. **Drive: 10 plays, 69 yards, 5:47.**

**Second quarter**

- LV – Matt Gay 32-yard field goal, 3:19. Raiders 10–7. **Drive: 15 plays, 75 yards, 8:00.**
- KC – Harrison Butker 28-yard field goal, 1:22. Tied 10–10. **Drive: 10 plays, 70 yards, 1:57.**
- LV – Matt Gay 48-yard field goal, 0:00. Raiders 13–10. **Drive: 8 plays, 41 yards, 1:22.**

**Third quarter**

- No scoring plays

**Fourth quarter**

- KC – Tyquan Thornton 8-yard pass from Patrick Mahomes (Harrison Butker kick), 14:50. Chiefs 17–13. **Drive: 3 plays, 84 yards, 0:40.**
- LV – Matt Gay 44-yard field goal, 11:12. Chiefs 17–16. **Drive: 7 plays, 19 yards, 3:38.**
- LV – Matt Gay 48-yard field goal, 4:53. Raiders 19–17. **Drive: 8 plays, 60 yards, 4:43.**
- KC – Kenneth Walker III 2-yard run (pass failed), 3:21. Chiefs 23–19. **Drive: 4 plays, 65 yards, 1:32.**
- KC – Kenneth Walker III 22-yard run (Harrison Butker kick), 3:02. Chiefs 30–19. **Drive: 1 play, 22 yards, 0:08.**
- LV – Brock Bowers 20-yard pass from Kirk Cousins (Kirk Cousins–Cody White pass), 1:46. Chiefs 30–27. **Drive: 5 plays, 65 yards, 1:16.**

**Top passers**

- KC – Patrick Mahomes – 15/30, 225 yards, 2 TD
- LV – Kirk Cousins – 31/52, 365 yards, 2 TD, INT

**Top rushers**

- KC – Kenneth Walker III – 22 rushes, 177 yards, 2 TD
- LV – Ashton Jeanty – 15 rushes, 58 yards

**Top receivers**

- KC – Tyquan Thornton – 5 receptions, 111 yards, 2 TD
- LV – Brock Bowers – 6 receptions, 86 yards, TD

==== Week 5: at New England Patriots ====
Week 5: Las Vegas Raiders at New England Patriots – Game summary

Quarter	1	2	3	4	Total
Raiders	7	0	3	7	**17**
**Patriots**	14	7	14	10	**45**

at Gillette Stadium, Foxborough, Massachusetts

- Date: October 11
- Game time: 1:00 p.m. EDT/10:00 a.m. PDT
- Game weather: Cloudy, 55 °F (13 °C)
- Game attendance: 64,628
- Referee: Craig Wrolstad
- TV announcers (CBS): Kevin Harlan, Trent Green and Melanie Collins
- Recap, Game Book

Game information

**First quarter**

- NE – DeMario Douglas 35-yard pass from Drake Maye (Andy Borregales kick), 11:23. Patriots 7–0. **Drive: 5 plays, 79 yards, 2:33.**
- LV – Brock Bowers 13-yard pass from Kirk Cousins (Matt Gay kick), 8:19. Tied 7–7. **Drive: 6 plays, 80 yards, 3:04.**
- NE – Rhamondre Stevenson 5-yard run (Andy Borregales kick), 1:30. Patriots 14–7. **Drive: 11 plays, 84 yards, 6:49.**

**Second quarter**

- NE – Hunter Henry 11-yard pass from Drake Maye (Andy Borregales kick), 0:24. Patriots 21–7. **Drive: 5 plays, 61 yards, 1:28.**

**Third quarter**

- NE – Kyle Williams 34-yard pass from Drake Maye (Andy Borregales kick), 12:58. Patriots 28–7. **Drive: 4 plays, 68 yards, 2:02.**
- LV – Matt Gay 46-yard field goal, 8:30. Patriots 28–10. **Drive: 5 plays, 24 yards, 1:18.**
- NE – Drake Maye 3-yard run (Andy Borregales kick), 3:10. Patriots 35–10. **Drive: 9 plays, 71 yards, 5:20.**

**Fourth quarter**

- NE – Andy Borregales 29-yard field goal, 14:12. Patriots 38–10. **Drive: 7 plays, 57 yards, 2:43.**
- LV – Dylan Laube 2-yard run (Matt Gay kick), 10:49. Patriots 38–17. **Drive: 8 plays, 74 yards, 3:23.**
- NE – DeMario Douglas 8-yard pass from Drake Maye (Andy Borregales kick), 6:06. Patriots 45–17. **Drive: 8 plays, 44 yards, 4:43.**

**Top passers**

- LV – Kirk Cousins – 19/28, 243 yards, TD
- NE – Drake Maye – 26/34, 374 yards, 4 TD

**Top rushers**

- LV – Ashton Jeanty – 10 rushes, 27 yards
- NE – Rhamondre Stevenson – 13 rushes, 64 yards, TD

**Top receivers**

- LV – Brock Bowers – 8 receptions, 110 yards, TD
- NE – Kyle Williams – 3 receptions, 91 yards, TD

==== Week 6: vs. Buffalo Bills ====
Week 6: Buffalo Bills at Las Vegas Raiders – Game summary

Quarter	1	2	3	4	Total
**Bills**	3	10	10	10	**33**
Raiders	7	6	0	17	**30**

at Allegiant Stadium, Paradise, Nevada

- Date: October 18
- Game time: 1:25 p.m. PDT
- Game weather: None (indoor stadium)
- Game attendance: 62,618
- Referee: Shawn Smith
- TV announcers (CBS): Jim Nantz, JJ Watt and Tracy Wolfson
- Recap, Game Book

Game information

**First quarter**

- BUF – Tyler Bass 44-yard field goal, 10:12. Bills 3–0. **Drive: 9 plays, 30 yards, 4:48.**
- LV – Ashton Jeanty 1-yard run (Matt Gay kick), 4:27. Raiders 7–3. **Drive: 9 plays 70 yards, 5:45.**

**Second quarter**

- BUF – Tyler Bass 28-yard field goal, 14:45. Raiders 7–6. **Drive: 10 plays, 58 yards, 4:42.**
- BUF – Khalil Shakir 9-yard pass from Josh Allen (Tyler Bass kick), 7:13. Bills 13–7. **Drive: 9 plays, 85 yards, 5:48.'**
- LV – Matt Gay 35-yard field goal, 2:14. Bills 13–10. **Drive: 10 plays, 57 yards, 4:59.**
- LV – Matt Gay 27-yard field goal, 0:00. Tied 13–13. **Drive: 8 plays, 58 yards, 1:40.**

**Third quarter**

- BUF – Tyler Bass 47-yard field goal, 9:45. Bills 16–13. **Drive: 9 plays, 37 yards, 4:40.**
- BUF – Keon Coleman 12-yard pass from Josh Allen (Tyler Bass kick), 6:22. Bills 23–13. **Drive: 6 plays, 32 yards, 2:32.'**

**Fourth quarter'**

- LV – Matt Gay 23-yard field goal, 13:32. Bills 23–16. **Drive: 15 plays, 70 yards, 7:50.**
- LV – Tre Tucker 11-yard pass from Kirk Cousins (Matt Gay kick), 8:07. 'Tied 23–23. **Drive: 9 plays, 91 yards, 3:49.**
- BUF – James Cook 3-yard run (Tyler Bass kick), 4:43. 'Bills 30–23. **Drive: 7 plays, 66 yards, 3:24.**
- BUF – Tyler Bass 38-yard field goal, 1:56. Bills 33–23. **Drive: 8 plays, 29 yards, 2:12.**
- LV – Tre Tucker 44-yard pass from Kirk Cousins (Matt Gay kick), 1:32. Bills 33–30. **Drive: 2 plays, 66 yards, 0:24.**

**Top passers**

- BUF – Josh Allen – 23/33, 255 yards, 2 TD
- LV – Kirk Cousins – 23/41, 313 yards, 2 TD, INT

**Top rushers**

- BUF – James Cook – 22 rushes, 95 yards, TD
- LV – Mike Washington Jr. – 9 rushes, 43 yards

**Top receivers**

- BUF – Keon Coleman – 4 receptions, 59 yards, TD
- LV – Tre Tucker – 5 receptions, 97 yards, 2 TD

==== Week 7: vs. Los Angeles Rams ====
Week 7: Los Angeles Rams at Las Vegas Raiders – Game summary

Quarter	1	2	3	4	Total
**Rams**	7	21	0	7	**35**
Raiders	3	3	0	15	**21**

at Allegiant Stadium, Paradise, Nevada

- Date: October 25
- Game time: 1:25 p.m. PDT
- Game weather: None (indoor stadium)
- Game attendance: 62,550
- Referee: Ronald Torbert
- TV announcers (Fox): Chris Myers, Jonathan Vilma, and Megan Olivi
- Recap, Game Book

Game information

**First quarter**

- LAR – Davis Allen 3-yard pass from Matthew Stafford (Brandon McManus kick), 6:25. Rams 7–0. **Drive: 8 plays, 59 yards, 4:23.**
- LV – Matt Gay 30-yard field goal, 0:51. Rams 7–3. **Drive: 9 plays, 38 yards, 5:34.**

**Second quarter**

- LAR – Davis Allen 5-yard pass from Matthew Stafford (Brandon McManus kick), 10:01. Rams 14–3. **Drive: 12 plays, 80 yards, 5:50.**
- LAR – Puka Nacua 11-yard pass from Matthew Stafford (Brandon McManus kick), 4:15. Rams 21–3. **Drive: 7 plays, 81 yards, 4:14.**
- LAR – Kyren Williams 17-yard run (Brandon McManus kick), 1:19. Rams 28–3. **Drive: 6 plays, 52 yards, 0:37.**
- LV – Matt Gay 27-yard field goal, 0:00. Rams 28–6. **Drive: 8 plays, 55 yards, 1:19.**

**Third quarter**

- No scoring plays

**Fourth quarter**

- LV – Tre Tucker 37-yard pass from Kirk Cousins (pass failed), 14:51. Rams 28–12. **Drive: 6 plays, 91 yards, 2:35.**
- LV – Ashton Jeanty 15-yard pass from Kirk Cousins (pass failed), 13:12. Rams 28–18. **Drive: 4 plays, 34 yards, 1:27.**
- LAR – Blake Corum 4-yard run (Brandon McManus kick), 6:34. Rams 35–18. **Drive: 12 plays, 70 yards, 6:38.**
- LV – Matt Gay 36-yard field goal, 4:11. Rams 35–21. **Drive: 10 plays, 47 yards, 2:23.**

**Top passers**

- LAR – Matthew Stafford – 23/29, 195 yards, 3 TD, INT
- LV – Kirk Cousins – 26/44, 295 yards, 2 TD

**Top rushers**

- LAR – Kyren Williams – 16 rushes, 99 yards, TD
- LV – Mike Washington Jr. – 6 rushes, 27 yards

**Top receivers**

- LAR – Puka Nacua – 8 receptions, 68 yards, TD
- LV – Tre Tucker – 5 receptions, 103 yards, TD

==== Week 8: at New York Jets ====
Week 8: Las Vegas Raiders at New York Jets – Game summary

Quarter	1	2	3	4	Total
**Raiders**	7	7	14	10	**38**
Jets	6	17	7	3	**33**

at MetLife Stadium, East Rutherford, New Jersey

- Date: November 1
- Game time: 1:00 p.m. EST/10:00 a.m. PST
- Game weather: Mostly sunny, 61 °F (16 °C)
- Game attendance: 70,080
- Referee: John Hussey
- TV announcers (Fox): Kenny Albert, Jonathan Vilma, and Megan Olivi
- Recap, Game Book

Game information

**First quarter**

- NYJ – Jason Sanders 21-yard field goal, 12:50. Jets 3–0. **Drive: 7 plays, 62 yards, 2:10.**
- LV – Brock Bowers 12-yard pass from Kirk Cousins (Matt Gay kick), 7:23. Raiders 7–3. **Drive: 10 plays, 60 yards, 5:27.**
- NYJ – Jason Sanders 36-yard field goal, 2:13. Raiders 7–6. **Drive: 12 plays, 48 yards, 5:10.**

**Second quarter**

- NYJ – Isaiah Williams 18-yard pass from Geno Smith (Jason Sanders kick), 10:56. Jets 13–7. **Drive: 8 plays, 70 yards, 3:51.**
- LV – Dylan Laube 95-yard kickoff return (Matt Gay kick), 10:44. Raiders 14–13.
- NYJ – Adonai Mitchell 12-yard pass from Geno Smith (Jason Sanders kick), 6:18. Jets 20–14. **Drive: 8 plays, 65 yards, 4:26.**
- NYJ – Jason Sanders 39-yard field goal, 0:09. Jets 23–14. **Drive: 9 plays, 33 yards, 3:40.**

**Third quarter**

- LV – Brock Bowers 2-yard pass from Kirk Cousins (Matt Gay kick), 9:59. Jets 23–21. **Drive: 10 plays, 65 yards, 5:01.**
- NYJ – Braelon Allen 21-yard run (Jason Sanders kick), 8:20. Jets 30–21. **Drive: 3 plays, 58 yards, 1:39.**
- LV – Kirk Cousins 1-yard rush (Matt Gay kick), 4:14. Jets 30–28. **Drive: 10 plays, 65 yards, 4:06.**

**Fourth quarter**

- LV – Jalen Nailor 2-yard pass from Kirk Cousins (Matt Gay kick), 11:33. Raiders 35–30. **Drive: 9 plays, 84 yards, 5:00.**
- NYJ – Jason Sanders 31-yard field goal, 4:31. Raiders 35–33. **Drive: 9 plays, 68 yards, 4:38.**
- LV – Matt Gay 53-yard field goal, 0:27. Raiders 38–33. **Drive: 9 plays, 30 yards, 4:04.**

**Top passers**

- LV – Kirk Cousins – 19/26, 247 yards, 3 TD
- NYJ – Geno Smith – 20/32, 290 yards, 2 TD, INT

**Top rushers**

- LV – Mike Washington Jr. – 25 rushes, 83 yards
- NYJ – Braelon Allen – 21 rushes, 147 yards, TD

**Top receivers**

- LV – Brock Bowers – 7 receptions, 92 yards, 2 TD
- NYJ – Adonai Mitchell – 7 receptions, 142 yards, TD

==== Week 9: at San Francisco 49ers ====
Week 9: Las Vegas Raiders at San Francisco 49ers – Game summary

Quarter	1	2	3	4	Total
Raiders	0	10	7	0	**17**
**49ers**	14	7	14	3	**38**

at Levi's Stadium, Santa Clara, California

- Date: November 8
- Game time: 1:25 p.m. PST
- Game weather: Mostly sunny, 70 °F (21 °C)
- Game attendance: 71,753
- Referee: Scott Novak
- TV announcers (Fox): Kevin Kugler, Daryl Johnston and Allison Williams
- Recap, Game Book

Game information

**First quarter**

- SF – Christian McCaffrey 1-yard run (Eddy Pineiro kick), 9:32. 49ers 7–0. **Drive: 12 plays, 69 yards, 5:28.**
- SF – Brock Purdy 1-yard rush (Eddy Pineiro kick), 1:52. 49ers 14–0. **Drive: 13 plays, 89 yards, 6:29.**

**Second quarter**

- LV – Kirk Cousins 2-yard run (Matt Gay kick), 12:41. 49ers 14–7. **Drive: 8 plays, 62 yards, 4:11.**
- SF – Christian McCaffrey 12-yard pass from Brock Purdy (Eddy Pineiro kick), 5:15. 49ers 21–7. **Drive: 12 plays, 84 yards, 7:26.**
- LV – Matt Gay 50-yard field goal, 1:12. 49ers 21–10. **Drive: 7 plays, 11 yards, 4:03.**

**Third quarter**

- SF – Jaden Dugger 35-yard interception return (Eddy Pineiro kick), 14:43. 49ers 28–10. **Drive: 1 plays, 0 yards, 0:17.**
- LV – Brock Bowers 25-yard pass from Kirk Cousins (Matt Gay kick), 9:29. 49ers 28–17. **Drive: 9 plays, 69 yards, 5:14.**
- SF – Jordan Watkins 37-yard pass from Brock Purdy (Eddy Pineiro kick), 0:36. 49ers 35–17. **Drive: 7 plays, 80 yards, 3:35.**

**Fourth quarter**

- SF – Eddy Pineiro 35-yard field goal, 5:21. 49ers 38–17. **Drive: 12 plays, 63 yards, 6:34.**

**Top passers**

- LV – Kirk Cousins – 22/31, 216 yards, TD, 3 INT
- SF – Brock Purdy – 29/42, 255 yards, 4 TD, INT

**Top rushers**

- LV – Ashton Jeanty – 6 rushes, 25 yards
- SF – Kaelon Black – 11 rushes, 70 yards

**Top receivers**

- LV – Brock Bowers – 7 receptions, 111 yards, TD
- SF – Jordan Watkins – 4 receptions, 86 yards, TD

This would be Kirk Cousins' final game with the Raiders as he was traded to the Minnesota Vikings a few days later. As a result, rookie quarterback Fernando Mendoza became the new starter going forward.

==== Week 10: vs. Seattle Seahawks ====
Week 10: Seattle Seahawks at Las Vegas Raiders – Game summary

Quarter	1	2	3	4	Total
**Seahawks**	7	0	14	0	**21**
Raiders	7	3	0	3	**13**

at Allegiant Stadium, Paradise, Nevada

- Date: November 15
- Game time: 1:05 p.m. PST
- Game weather: None (indoor stadium)
- Game attendance: 62,624
- Referee: Brad Allen
- TV announcers (CBS): Ian Eagle, Ross Tucker and Evan Washburn
- Recap, Game Book

Game information

**First quarter**

- LV – Fernando Mendoza 10-yard run (Matt Gay kick), 7:41. Raiders 7–0. **Drive: 11 plays, 46 yards, 6:21.**
- SEA – Cooper Kupp 34-yard pass from Drew Lock (Jason Myers kick), 2:32. Tied 7–7. **Drive: 8 plays, 73 yards, 5:09.**

**Second quarter**

- LV – Matt Gay 34-yard field goal, 11:13. Raiders 10–7. **Drive: 11 plays, 49 yards, 6:19.**

**Third quarter**

- SEA – Jadarian Price 12-yard run (Jason Myers kick), 9:28. Seahawks 14–10. **Drive: 8 plays, 87 yards, 3:59.**
- SEA – Jaxon Smith-Njigba 71-yard pass from Drew Lock (Jason Myers kick), 7:10. Seahawks 21–10. **Drive: 3 plays, 78 yards, 1:02.**

**Fourth quarter**

- LV – Matt Gay 43-yard field goal, 2:04. Seahawks 21–13. **Drive: 10 plays, 44 yards, 2:18.**

**Top passers**

- SEA – Drew Lock – 14/17, 240 yards, 2 TD
- LV – Fernando Mendoza – 17/29, 143 yards

**Top rushers**

- SEA – Zach Charbonnet – 20 rushes, 94 yards
- LV – Mike Washington Jr. – 8 rushes, 23 yards

**Top receivers**

- SEA – Jaxon Smith-Njigba – 8 receptions, 171 yards, TD
- LV – Ashton Jeanty – 4 receptions, 46 yards

==== Week 11: at Denver Broncos ====
Week 11: Las Vegas Raiders at Denver Broncos – Game summary

Quarter	1	2	3	4	Total
Raiders	0	0	0	0	**0**
Broncos	0	0	0	0	**0**

at Empower Field at Mile High, Denver, Colorado

- Date: November 22
- Game time: 2:25 p.m. MST/1:25 p.m. PST
- Game weather: Mostly sunny, 44 °F (7 °C)
- Referee: Carl Cheffers
- TV announcers (CBS): Andrew Catalon, Logan Ryan and AJ Ross
- Preview

=== Standings ===
==== Division ====
AFC West
	W	L	T	PCT	DIV	CONF	PF	PA	STK
Kansas City Chiefs	8	2	0	.800	3–1	6–1	271	163	W3
Denver Broncos	7	2	0	.778	2–1	3–1	198	186	W5
Las Vegas Raiders	4	6	0	.400	1–1	3–3	251	289	L2
Los Angeles Chargers	1	8	0	.111	0–3	1–5	144	239	W1

==== Conference ====
AFC
Seed	Team	Division	W	L	T	PCT	DIV	CONF	SOS	SOV	STK
**Division leaders**
1	Buffalo Bills	East	9	1	0	.900	2–1	6–1	.424	.416	W6
2	Kansas City Chiefs	West	8	2	0	.800	3–1	6–1	.374	.300	W3
3 (Note: Jacksonville wins tie break over Cincinnati based on head-to-head victory.)	Jacksonville Jaguars	South	7	2	0	.778	2–1	6–2	.444	.408	W3
4	Cincinnati Bengals	North	7	2	0	.778	2–1	5–2	.389	.310	W5
**Wild cards**
5	Denver Broncos	West	7	2	0	.778	2–1	3–1	.591	.522	W5
6 (Note: Cleveland wins tie break over Pittsburgh based on division record.)	Cleveland Browns	North	6	4	0	.600	2–1	4–3	.410	.377	W1
7	Pittsburgh Steelers	North	6	4	0	.600	2–2	3–3	.465	.417	L2
**In the hunt**
8	New England Patriots	East	5	5	0	.500	3–0	5–1	.576	.440	L2
9 (Note: Houston wins tie break over Las Vegas based on strength of victory.)	Houston Texans	South	4	6	0	.400	3–1	4–4	.480	.308	W1
10	Las Vegas Raiders	West	4	6	0	.400	1–1	3–3	.500	.179	L2
11	Baltimore Ravens	North	4	7	0	.364	0–2	2–5	.459	.286	L6
12	Indianapolis Colts	South	3	8	0	.273	1–3	2–6	.463	.293	L1
13	New York Jets	East	2	8	0	.200	0–3	2–5	.560	.350	L5
14	Los Angeles Chargers	West	1	8	0	.111	0–3	1–5	.560	.364	W1
15 (Note: Tennessee wins tie break over Miami based on strength of victory.)	Tennessee Titans	South	1	9	0	.100	1–2	1–6	.465	.273	L4
16	Miami Dolphins	East	1	9	0	.100	1–2	1–6	.622	.200	L4
