= 2025 Las Vegas Raiders season =

66th season in franchise history; 56th in the National Football League

- Owner: Mark Davis
- General manager: John Spytek
- Head coach: Pete Carroll
- Home stadium: Allegiant Stadium

Results
- Record: 3–14
- Division place: 4th AFC West
- Playoffs: Did not qualify
- Pro Bowlers: TE Brock Bowers; DE Maxx Crosby

Uniform
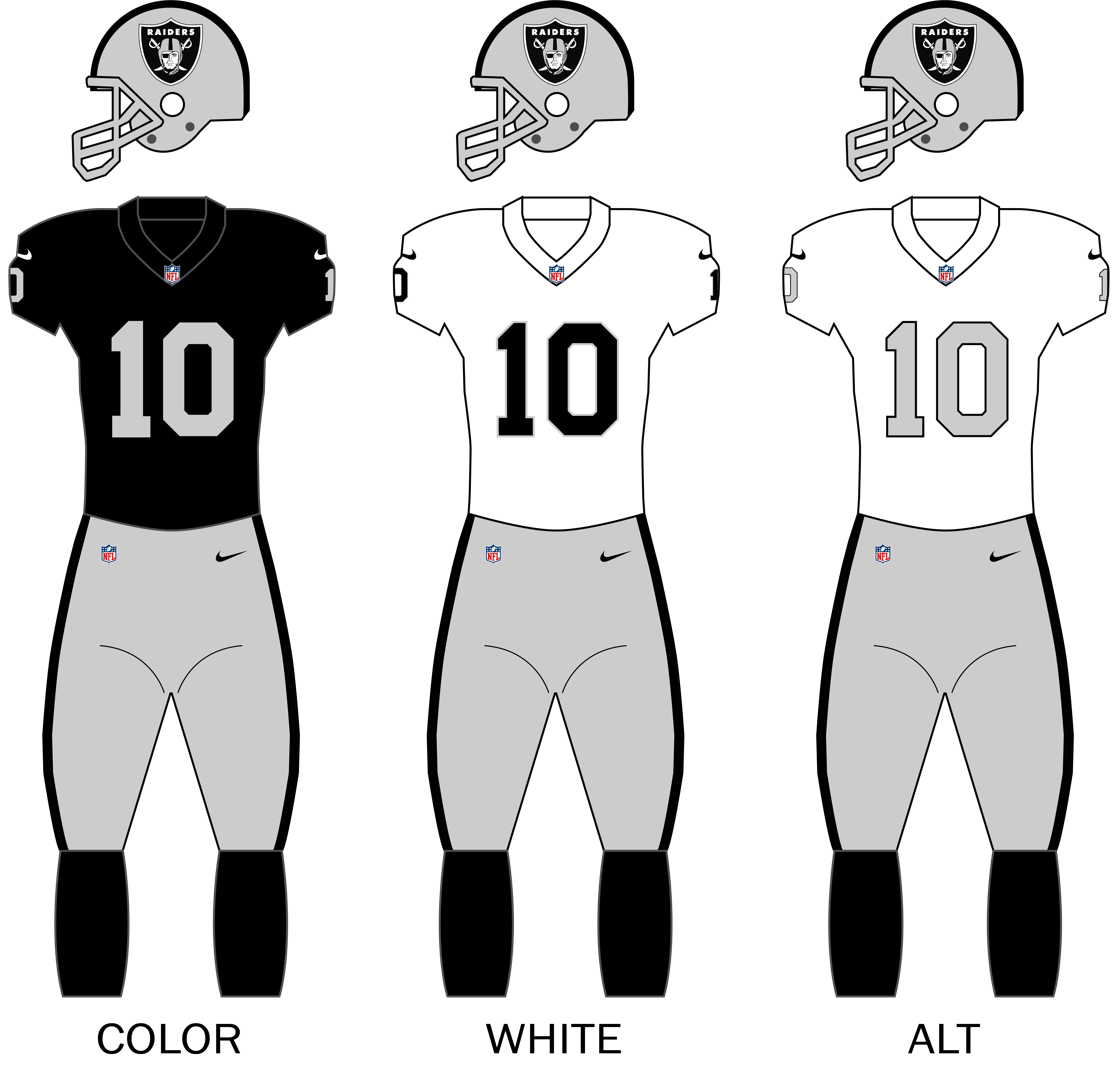

The 2025 season was the Las Vegas Raiders' 56th in the National Football League (NFL), their 66th overall, their sixth in Las Vegas, their first under general manager John Spytek and their only season under head coach Pete Carroll. Unable to improve on their 4–13 record from 2024, the Raiders failed to qualify for the playoffs for the fourth consecutive season (the 21st time in 23 seasons), and instead regressed further to 3–14 for their fourth consecutive losing season. Their .176 winning percentage was their worst since 2006 when they were based in Oakland. Despite having the same 3–14 record as the New York Jets, Tennessee Titans, and the Arizona Cardinals, the Raiders finished with the worst overall record based on a tie-breaker, clinching the first overall pick in the 2026 NFL draft; they clinched the first pick in the draft for the first time since 2007 when they were based in Oakland.

This season began with the team's fourth head coach and offensive coordinator in five seasons, their third general manager in four seasons, their third head coach in as many seasons, and their fourth quarterback to start opening day in as many seasons. The Raiders failed to win the AFC West for the 23rd consecutive season. On January 5, the day after the season concluded, the Raiders fired Carroll, marking the third consecutive season the team had fired its head coach.

The Raiders had a four-year aggregate record of 21–47 (.309) from 2022 to 2025, the worst four-year stretch for the franchise since moving to Vegas, and the worst overall since they went 18–46 (.281) from 2012 to 2015 when they were based in Oakland. For the second season in a row, the Raiders failed to win a single road game against the Broncos, Chiefs, or Chargers. In their season finale, they did, however, end a streak of 7 consecutive losses at home to the Chiefs. Raiders defensive coordinator Patrick Graham signed with the Pittsburgh Steelers in the 2026 offseason, 4 years after signing with the team in 2022.

The Las Vegas Raiders drew an average home attendance of 62,362. The Raider offense scored just 241 points on the season, which was an NFL-worst. Since losing Super Bowl XXXVII in 2002 when they were based in Oakland, the Raiders have a 23-year aggregate record of 131–242 (.351) from 2003 to 2025, the second-worst in the NFL during that span.

== Offseason ==
=== Coaching changes ===
Following the end of the 2024 season, the Raiders fired head coach Antonio Pierce. Two days later, general manager Tom Telesco was also fired. Owner Mark Davis said that new part owner of the team, Tom Brady, would play a role in the selection of a new head coach and general manager. On January 22, 2025, the team named Tampa Bay Buccaneers assistant general manager, John Spytek as the team's new general manager. Spytek had a long relationship with Brady going back to college and the two were teammates with the Buccaneers in their 2020 Super Bowl winning season. On January 25, the Raiders named former Seattle Seahawks head coach Pete Carroll the team's new head coach.

On January 31, the team announced that defensive coordinator Patrick Graham would remain on the staff in the same position. Ohio State offensive coordinator and former Philadelphia Eagles head coach Chip Kelly was named the new offensive coordinator on February 2. On February 3, it was reported that Carroll would hire his son, Brennan, as the team's new offensive line coach. On November 23, the Raiders fired Kelly as offensive coordinator.

=== Player trades ===
Date	Player(s)/Asset(s) received	Team	Player(s)/Asset(s) traded
March 13	QB Geno Smith	Seattle Seahawks	2025 third round pick (via DET)
November 4	2026 fourth and sixth round pick	Jacksonville Jaguars	WR Jakobi Meyers

=== Players additions ===
Position	Player	Former team	Date
G	Alex Cappa	Cincinnati Bengals	March 5
S	Jeremy Chinn	Washington Commanders	March 13
CB	Lonnie Johnson Jr.	Carolina Panthers	March 13
RB	Raheem Mostert	Miami Dolphins	March 13
LB	Elandon Roberts	Pittsburgh Steelers	March 13
CB	Eric Stokes	Green Bay Packers	March 13
DT	Leki Fotu	New York Jets	March 25
TE	Ian Thomas	Carolina Panthers	March 25
LB	Devin White	Houston Texans	March 28
LB	Germaine Pratt	Cincinnati Bengals	June 11

=== Players lost ===
Position	Player	New team	Date
S	Tre'von Moehrig	Carolina Panthers	March 12
TE	Harrison Bryant	Philadelphia Eagles	March 13
CB	Nate Hobbs	Green Bay Packers	March 13
LB	Robert Spillane	New England Patriots	March 13
LB	Divine Deablo	Atlanta Falcons	March 14
S	Marcus Epps	New England Patriots	March 14
RB	Alexander Mattison	Miami Dolphins	March 14
QB	Gardner Minshew	Kansas City Chiefs	March 17
C	Andre James	Los Angeles Chargers	March 18
DT	John Jenkins	Baltimore Ravens	May 16

=== Draft ===
2025 Las Vegas Raiders draft selections
Round	Selection	Player	Position	College	Notes
1	6	Ashton Jeanty	RB	Boise State	
2	37	Traded to the Dolphins			
2	48	Traded to the Texans			From Dolphins
2	58	Jack Bech	WR	TCU	From Texans
3	68	Darien Porter	CB	Iowa State	
3	92	Traded to the Seattle Seahawks (Note: The Raiders traded this third-round selection (92nd overall) to the Seattle Seahawks in exchange for QB Geno Smith.)			From Detroit (Note: The Jets traded a 2024 fourth-round selection (126th overall) to the Detroit Lions in exchange for a third-round selection (92nd overall).) via New York Jets (Note: The Raiders traded WR Davante Adams to the New York Jets in exchange for this third round selection (being conditional at the time of the trade) The condition – that Las Vegas would receive a second-round pick in 2025 if Adams was named to the 2024 All-Pro Team during the 2024 NFL season or Adams was designated as an active player on the Jets' roster for the AFC Championship Game or Super Bowl LIX – was not met when the Jets were eliminated from playoff contention and Adams was not named to the 2024 All-Pro Team, eventually receiving the Jets' third round selection previously acquired from the Lions (92nd overall).)
3	98	Caleb Rogers	T	Texas Tech	From Dolphins
3	99	Charles Grant	T	William & Mary	Compensatory selection; From New York Giants via Houston
4	108	Dont'e Thornton	WR	Tennessee	
4	135	Tonka Hemingway	DT	South Carolina	From Dolphins
5	143	Traded to the Dolphins			
6	180	JJ Pegues	DT	Ole Miss	
6	213	Tommy Mellott	QB/WR	Montana State	Compensatory selection
6	215	Cam Miller	QB	North Dakota State	Compensatory selection
7	222	Cody Lindenberg	LB	Minnesota	

2025 Las Vegas Raiders undrafted free agents
Name	Position	College	Ref.
Tank Booker	DT	SMU	
Dominic Boyd	T	Georgia Southern	
Hudson Clark	S	Arkansas	
Parker Clements	T	Virginia Tech	
Pat Conroy	TE	Old Dominion	
Mello Dotson	CB	Kansas	
Zakhari Franklin	WR	Illinois	
Jarrod Hufford	C	Iowa State	
John Humphrey	CB	USC	
Matt Jones	LB	Baylor	
Jah Joyner	DE	Minnesota	
Treven Ma'ae	DT	Baylor	
Carter Runyon	TE	Towson	
Greedy Vance	CB	USC	
Jailin Walker	LB	Indiana	

Draft trades

== Staff ==
2025 Las Vegas Raiders staff
Front office: Owner – Mark Davis; President – Sandra Douglass Morgan; General manager – John Spytek; Assistant general manager – Brian Stark; Senior vice president/director of football administration – Tom Delaney; Senior vice president of football operations and strategy – Mark Thewes; Senior personnel executive – Anthony Patch; VP, player personnel – Brandon Hunt; VP, football research and development – David Christoff; Director of football systems – Brad Goldsberry; Director of college scouting – Brandon Yeargan; Assistant director of college scouting – Johnathon Stigall; Assistant director of pro scouting – Ben Chester; Senior national scout – Andy Dengler; Senior national scout – Lenny McGill; Senior vice president of coaching operations – Matt Capurro; Head coach research specialist – Ryan Paganetti; Coaching analyst – Kenan Clarke; Head coaches: Head coach – Pete Carroll; Offensive coaches: Interim offensive coordinator/quarterbacks – Greg Olson; Assistant quarterbacks/game management – Nate Carroll; Running backs – Deland McCullough; Wide receivers – Chris Beatty; Tight ends – Luke Steckel; Run game coordinator/offensive line – Brennan Carroll; Assistant offensive line – Andy Dickerson; Senior offensive assistant – Joe Philbin; Offensive assistant – Sean Binckes; Offensive quality control – Kyle Fuller; Offensive quality control – Conner McQueen	Defensive coaches: Defensive coordinator – Patrick Graham; Run game coordinator/defensive line – Rob Leonard; Assistant defensive line – Kenyon Jackson; Linebackers – John Glenn; Defensive backs – Marcus Robertson; Pass game coordinator/defensive backs – Joe Woods; Defensive assistant/linebackers – Tyrone McKenzie; Defensive assistant – Rip Rowan; Defensive quality control – Beyah Rasool; Special teams coaches: Interim special teams coordinator – Derius Swinton II; Assistant special teams – Kade Rannings; Strength and conditioning: Head strength and conditioning – A. J. Neibel; Assistant head strength and conditioning – Rick Slate; Assistant strength and conditioning – Matthew Fyle; Assistant strength and conditioning – Haley Roberts; Strength and conditioning assistant – Deuce Gruden

== Final roster ==
2025 Las Vegas Raiders roster
Quarterbacks (QB): 12 Aidan O'Connell; 15 Kenny Pickett; 7 Geno Smith; Running backs (RB): 2 Ashton Jeanty; 23 Dylan Laube; 31 Raheem Mostert; 3 Zamir White; Wide receivers (WR): 81 Alex Bachman; 18 Jack Bech; 4 Shedrick Jackson; 17 Tyler Lockett; 10 Dont'e Thornton; 1 Tre Tucker; Tight ends (TE): 87 Michael Mayer; 46 Carter Runyon; 80 Ian Thomas	Offensive linemen (OL): 65 Alex Cappa RG; 70 Stone Forsythe RT; 71 DJ Glaze RT; 60 Charles Grant LT; 56 Atonio Mafi G; 66 Dylan Parham LG; 67 Will Putnam C; 76 Caleb Rogers LG; Defensive linemen (DL): 99 Thomas Booker DT; 69 Adam Butler DT; 91 Jahfari Harvey DE; 97 Tonka Hemingway DT; 51 Malcolm Koonce DE; 96 Jonah Laulu DT; 93 Brodric Martin DT; 92 JJ Pegues DT; 49 Charles Snowden DE; 9 Tyree Wilson DE	Linebackers (LB): 33 Jamal Adams OLB; 44 Tommy Eichenberg MLB; 55 Cody Lindenberg MLB; 59 Jon Rhattigan OLB; 52 Elandon Roberts MLB; 45 Devin White OLB; Defensive backs (DB): 29 Chigozie Anusiem CB; 28 Terrell Edmunds SS; 30 Darnay Holmes CB; 32 Lonnie Johnson Jr. S; 27 Tristin McCollum SS; 20 Isaiah Pola-Mao FS; 26 Darien Porter CB; 25 Decamerion Richardson CB; 22 Eric Stokes CB; 41 Greedy Vance Jr. CB; Special teams (ST): 50 Jacob Bobenmoyer LS; 8 Daniel Carlson K; 6 AJ Cole P	Practice squad: 57 Boogie Basham DE; 35 Chris Collier RB; 63 McClendon Curtis G; 48 Jamin Davis OLB; 13 Phillip Dorsett WR; 39 Luke Elkin LS; 37 Brandon Hill S; 68 Treven Ma'ae DT; 77 Joshua Miles LT; 86 Albert Okwuegbunam TE; 82 Brenden Rice WR; 64 Layden Robinson G; 88 Justin Shorter WR; 79 Laki Tasi G (IPP); 19 D. J. Turner WR; 78 Dalton Wagner LT; Reserve: 89 Brock Bowers TE (IR); 11 Jeremy Chinn SS (IR); 98 Maxx Crosby DE (IR); 54 Brennan Jackson OLB (IR); 36 Kyu Blu Kelly CB (IR); 61 Jordan Meredith C (IR); 74 Kolton Miller LT (IR/DFR); 58 Jackson Powers-Johnson RG (IR); Rookies in italics 53 active, 8 reserve, 16 practice squad

== Preseason ==
Week	Date	Opponent	Result	Record	Venue	Recap
1	August 7	at Seattle Seahawks	T 23–23	0–0–1	Lumen Field	Recap
2	August 16	San Francisco 49ers	L 19–22	0–1–1	Allegiant Stadium	Recap
3	August 23	at Arizona Cardinals	L 10–20	0–2–1	State Farm Stadium	Recap

== Regular season ==
=== Schedule ===
Week	Date	Opponent	Result	Record	Venue	Recap
1	September 7	at New England Patriots	**W** 20–13	1–0	Gillette Stadium	Recap
2	September 15	**Los Angeles Chargers**	**L** 9–20	1–1	Allegiant Stadium	Recap
3	September 21	at Washington Commanders	**L** 24–41	1–2	Northwest Stadium	Recap
4	September 28	Chicago Bears	**L** 24–25	1–3	Allegiant Stadium	Recap
5	October 5	at Indianapolis Colts	**L** 6–40	1–4	Lucas Oil Stadium	Recap
6	October 12	Tennessee Titans	**W** 20–10	2–4	Allegiant Stadium	Recap
7	October 19	at **Kansas City Chiefs**	**L** 0–31	2–5	Arrowhead Stadium	Recap
8	Bye					
9	November 2	Jacksonville Jaguars	**L** 29–30 (OT)	2–6	Allegiant Stadium	Recap
10	November 6	at **Denver Broncos**	**L** 7–10	2–7	Empower Field at Mile High	Recap
11	November 17	Dallas Cowboys	**L** 16–33	2–8	Allegiant Stadium	Recap
12	November 23	Cleveland Browns	**L** 10–24	2–9	Allegiant Stadium	Recap
13	November 30	at **Los Angeles Chargers**	**L** 14–31	2–10	SoFi Stadium	Recap
14	December 7	**Denver Broncos**	**L** 17–24	2–11	Allegiant Stadium	Recap
15	December 14	at Philadelphia Eagles	**L** 0–31	2–12	Lincoln Financial Field	Recap
16	December 21	at Houston Texans	**L** 21–23	2–13	NRG Stadium	Recap
17	December 28	New York Giants	**L** 10–34	2–14	Allegiant Stadium	Recap
18	January 4	**Kansas City Chiefs**	**W** 14–12	3–14	Allegiant Stadium	Recap
Note: Intra-division opponents are in **bold** text.

=== Game summaries ===
==== Week 1: at New England Patriots ====
Week 1: Las Vegas Raiders at New England Patriots – Game summary

Quarter	1	2	3	4	Total
**Raiders**	7	0	10	3	**20**
Patriots	7	3	0	3	**13**

at Gillette Stadium, Foxborough, Massachusetts

- Date: September 7
- Game time: 1:00 p.m. EDT/10:00 a.m. PDT
- Game weather: Rain, 64 °F (18 °C)
- Game attendance: 64,628
- Referee: Ron Torbert
- TV announcers (CBS): Spero Dedes, Adam Archuleta and Aditi Kinkhabwala
- Recap, Game Book

Game information

**First quarter**

- LV – Tre Tucker 26-yard pass from Geno Smith (Daniel Carlson kick), 12:17. Raiders 7–0. **Drive: 6 plays, 66 yards, 2:43.**
- NE – Demario Douglas 2-yard pass from Drake Maye (Andrés Borregales kick), 1:02. Tied 7–7. **Drive: 12 plays, 82 yards, 5:20.**

**Second quarter**

- NE – Andrés Borregales 35-yard field goal, 1:57. Patriots 10–7. **Drive: 9 plays, 56 yards, 5:45.**

**Third quarter**

- LV – Ashton Jeanty 3-yard run (Daniel Carlson kick), 9:39. Raiders 14–10. **Drive: 5 plays, 71 yards, 2:35.**
- LV – Daniel Carlson 51-yard field goal, 0:52. Raiders 17–10. **Drive: 6 plays, 52 yards, 3:35.**

**Fourth quarter**

- LV – Daniel Carlson 40-yard field goal, 6:46. Raiders 20–10. **Drive: 12 plays, 66 yards, 6:47.**
- NE – Andrés Borregales 44-yard field goal, 0:19. Raiders 20–13. **Drive: 10 plays, 54 yards, 1:29.**

**Top passers**

- LV – Geno Smith – 24/34, 362 yards, TD, INT
- NE – Drake Maye – 30/46, 287 yards, TD, INT

**Top rushers**

- LV – Ashton Jeanty – 19 rushes, 38 yards, TD
- NE – TreVeyon Henderson – 5 rushes, 27 yards

**Top receivers**

- LV – Brock Bowers – 5 receptions, 103 yards
- NE – Kayshon Boutte – 6 receptions, 103 yards

The Raiders won their first game in New England since 1994 when they were based in Los Angeles. This was also the Raiders third win over New England since 2022. Geno Smith had a swell performance by throwing 362 yards, one touchdown, and completed 70.6 percent of his passes to go with his 102.8 passer rating, but he also threw an interception.

==== Week 2: vs. Los Angeles Chargers ====
Week 2: Los Angeles Chargers at Las Vegas Raiders – Game summary

Quarter	1	2	3	4	Total
**Chargers**	10	7	3	0	**20**
Raiders	3	3	0	3	**9**

at Allegiant Stadium, Paradise, Nevada

- Date: September 15
- Game time: 7:00 p.m. PDT
- Game weather: None (indoor stadium)
- Game attendance: 62,526
- Referee: Clay Martin
- TV announcers (KTNV/ESPN): Chris Fowler, Dan Orlovsky, Louis Riddick, Katie George, and Peter Schrager
  Game exclusive to KTNV through syndication. Out of market on ESPN.
- Recap, Game Book

Game information

**First quarter**

- LAC – Cameron Dicker 38-yard field goal, 13:47. Chargers 3–0. **Drive: 4 plays, 5 yards, 1:02.**
- LV – Daniel Carlson 54-yard field goal, 9:07. Tied 3–3. **Drive: 12 plays, 34 yards, 4:41.**
- LAC – Keenan Allen 10-yard pass from Justin Herbert (Cameron Dicker kick), 0:20. Chargers 10–3. **Drive: 11 plays, 60 yards, 5:14.**

**Second quarter**

- LV – Daniel Carlson 40-yard field goal, 9:58. Chargers 10–6. **Drive: 14 plays, 48 yards, 5:26.**
- LAC – Quentin Johnston 60-yard pass from Justin Herbert (Cameron Dicker kick), 1:51. Chargers 17–6. **Drive: 6 plays, 91 yards, 2:43.**

**Third quarter**

- LAC – Cameron Dicker 20-yard field goal, 7:33. Chargers 20–6. **Drive: 15 plays, 72 yards, 7:30.**

**Fourth quarter**

- LV – Daniel Carlson 37-yard field goal, 11:19. Chargers 20–9. **Drive: 22 plays, 67 yards, 11:15.**

**Top passers**

- LAC – Justin Herbert – 19/27, 242 yards, 2 TD
- LV – Geno Smith – 24/43, 180 yards, 3 INT

**Top rushers**

- LAC – Justin Herbert – 9 rushes, 31 yards
- LV – Ashton Jeanty – 11 rushes, 43 yards

**Top receivers**

- LAC – Quentin Johnston – 3 receptions, 71 yards, TD
- LV – Jakobi Meyers – 6 receptions, 68 yards

Head Coach Pete Carroll and Chargers head coach Jim Harbaugh rekindled their rivalry for the first time since 2014, as the Chargers' defense dominated the Raiders' offense, leading to a loss for Las Vegas. Geno Smith had an extremely poor performance by throwing 180 yards, no touchdowns, three interceptions, and completed just 55.8 percent of his passes to go with his 37 passer rating.

==== Week 3: at Washington Commanders ====
Week 3: Las Vegas Raiders at Washington Commanders – Game summary

Quarter	1	2	3	4	Total
Raiders	3	7	0	14	**24**
**Commanders**	7	13	14	7	**41**

at Northwest Stadium, Landover, Maryland

- Date: September 21
- Game time: 1:00 p.m. EDT/10:00 a.m. PDT
- Game weather: Cloudy, 72 °F (22 °C)
- Game attendance: 64,546
- Referee: Shawn Hochuli
- TV announcers (Fox): Chris Myers, Mark Schlereth and Jen Hale
- Recap, Game Book

Game information

**First quarter**

- WAS – Marcus Mariota 2-yard run (Matt Gay kick), 11:51. Commanders 7–0. **Drive: 5 plays, 27 yards, 3:09.**
- LV – Daniel Carlson 37-yard field goal, 9:46. Commanders 7–3. **Drive: 5 plays, 41 yards, 2:05.**

**Second quarter**

- WAS – Matt Gay 46-yard field goal, 9:56. Commanders 10–3. **Drive: 8 plays, 44 yards, 5:20.**
- LV – Tre Tucker 10-yard pass from Geno Smith (Daniel Carlson kick), 4:20. Tied 10–10. **Drive: 9 plays, 80 yards, 5:36.**
- WAS – Jeremy McNichols 60-yard run (Matt Gay kick), 3:31. Commanders 17–10. **Drive: 2 plays, 65 yards, 0:49.**
- WAS – Matt Gay 56-yard field goal, 0:00. Commanders 20–10. **Drive: 4 plays, 28 yards, 0:27.**

**Third quarter**

- WAS – Jaylin Lane 90-yard punt return (Matt Gay kick), 9:35. Commanders 27–10.
- WAS – Jacory Croskey-Merritt 1-yard run (Matt Gay kick), 3:03. Commanders 34–10. **Drive: 5 plays, 63 yards, 2:20.**

**Fourth quarter**

- LV – Tre Tucker 10-yard pass from Geno Smith (run failed), 12:57. Commanders 34–16. **Drive: 11 plays, 70 yards, 5:06.**
- LV – Tre Tucker 61-yard pass from Geno Smith (Geno Smith–Brock Bowers pass), 3:42. Commanders 34–24. **Drive: 3 plays, 83 yards, 0:38.**
- WAS – Luke McCaffrey 43-yard pass from Marcus Mariota (Matt Gay kick), 2:05. Commanders 41–24. **Drive: 3 plays, 46 yards, 1:37.**

**Top passers**

- LV – Geno Smith – 19/29, 289 yards, 3 TD
- WAS – Marcus Mariota – 15/21, 207 yards, TD

**Top rushers**

- LV – Ashton Jeanty – 17 rushes, 63 yards
- WAS – Jeremy McNichols – 4 rushes, 78 yards, TD

**Top receivers**

- LV – Tre Tucker – 8 receptions, 145 yards, 3 TD
- WAS – Terry McLaurin – 3 receptions, 74 yards

Geno Smith had a masterful performance by throwing 289 yards, three touchdowns, no interceptions, and completed 65.5 percent of his passes to go with his 132.7 passer rating. Despite that, he could not succeed at helping the Raiders win.

==== Week 4: vs. Chicago Bears ====
Week 4: Chicago Bears at Las Vegas Raiders – Game summary

Quarter	1	2	3	4	Total
**Bears**	3	6	7	9	**25**
Raiders	7	7	7	3	**24**

at Allegiant Stadium, Paradise, Nevada

- Date: September 28
- Game time: 1:25 p.m. PDT
- Game weather: None (indoor stadium)
- Game attendance: 62,642
- Referee: Adrian Hill
- TV announcers (CBS): Spero Dedes, Adam Archuleta and Aditi Kinkhabwala
- Recap, Game Book

Game information

**First quarter**

- CHI – Cairo Santos 46-yard field goal, 9:53. Bears 3–0. **Drive: 4 plays, -4 yards, 0:55.**
- LV – Ashton Jeanty 8-yard pass from Geno Smith (Daniel Carlson kick), 0:08. Raiders 7–3. **Drive: 7 plays, 66 yards, 4:08.**

**Second quarter**

- CHI – Cairo Santos 43-yard field goal, 4:22. Raiders 7–6. **Drive: 8 plays, -1 yard, 4:26.**
- LV – Ashton Jeanty 64-yard run (Daniel Carlson kick), 4:03. Raiders 14–6. **Drive: 1 play, 64 yards, 0:19.**
- CHI – Cairo Santos 52-yard field goal, 0:53. Raiders 14–9. **Drive: 9 plays, 37 yards, 3:10.**

**Third quarter**

- CHI – Rome Odunze 27-yard pass from Caleb Williams (Cairo Santos kick), 11:38. Bears 16–14. **Drive: 7 plays, 40 yards, 3:04.**
- LV – Ashton Jeanty 9-yard pass from Geno Smith (Daniel Carlson kick), 5:23. Raiders 21–16. **Drive: 10 plays, 80 yards, 6:15.**

**Fourth quarter**

- CHI – Cairo Santos 51-yard field goal, 11:38. Raiders 21–19. **Drive: 8 plays, 16 yards, 4:29.**
- LV – Daniel Carlson 29-yard field goal, 6:45. Raiders 24–19. **Drive: 9 plays, 63 yards, 4:53.**
- CHI – D'Andre Swift 2-yard run (pass failed), 1:34. Bears 25–24. **Drive: 11 plays, 69 yards, 5:11.**

**Top passers**

- CHI – Caleb Williams – 22/37, 212 yards, TD, INT
- LV – Geno Smith – 14/21, 117 yards, 2 TD, 3 INT

**Top rushers**

- CHI – D'Andre Swift – 14 rushes, 38 yards, TD
- LV – Ashton Jeanty – 21 rushes, 138 yards, TD

**Top receivers**

- CHI – Rome Odunze – 4 receptions, 69 yards, TD
- LV – Brock Bowers – 5 receptions, 46 yards

The Raiders attempted to score a game winning field goal, but it was blocked by Chicago, resulting in the Raiders falling to 1–3.

==== Week 5: at Indianapolis Colts ====
Week 5: Las Vegas Raiders at Indianapolis Colts – Game summary

Quarter	1	2	3	4	Total
Raiders	3	0	0	3	**6**
**Colts**	0	20	20	0	**40**

at Lucas Oil Stadium, Indianapolis, Indiana

- Date: October 5
- Game time: 1:00 p.m. EDT/10:00 a.m. PDT
- Game weather: None (retractable roof closed)
- Game attendance: 64,955
- Referee: Alex Kemp
- TV announcers (Fox): Chris Myers and Brady Quinn
- Recap, Game Book

Game information

**First quarter**

- LV – Daniel Carlson 24-yard field goal, 3:21. Raiders 3–0. **Drive: 16 plays, 80 yards, 9:50.**

**Second quarter**

- IND – Tyler Warren 11-yard pass from Daniel Jones (Spencer Shrader kick), 11:33. Colts 7–3. **Drive: 13 plays, 83 yards, 6:48.**
- IND – Jonathan Taylor 3-yard run (Spencer Shrader kick), 7:56. Colts 14–3. **Drive: 4 plays, 8 yards, 1:33.**
- IND – Michael Pittman Jr. 4-yard pass from Daniel Jones (pass failed), 0:15. Colts 20–3. **Drive: 14 plays, 88 yards, 3:38.**

**Third quarter**

- IND – Jonathan Taylor 1-yard run (pass failed), 6:54. Colts 26–3. **Drive: 11 plays, 68 yards, 6:03.**
- IND – Ameer Abdullah 2-yard run (pass failed), 5:49. Colts 32–3. **Drive: 2 plays, 6 yards, 0:30.**
- IND – Jonathan Taylor 6-yard run (Jonathan Taylor run), 2:27. Colts 40–3. **Drive: 3 plays, 44 yards, 1:20.**

**Fourth quarter**

- LV – Daniel Carlson 37-yard field goal, 11:39. Colts 40–6. **Drive: 13 plays, 47 yards, 5:48.**

**Top passers**

- LV – Geno Smith – 25/36, 228 yards, 2 INT
- IND – Daniel Jones – 20/29, 212 yards, 2 TD

**Top rushers**

- LV – Ashton Jeanty – 14 rushes, 67 yards
- IND – Jonathan Taylor – 17 rushes, 66 yards, 3 TD

**Top receivers**

- LV – Tre Tucker – 4 receptions, 62 yards
- IND – Ashton Dulin – 2 receptions, 55 yards

The Raiders failed to record a sack for the first time in 40 games, ending the league's longest active streak. With the blowout loss, the Raiders suffered their worst loss since falling 48–9 to the Chiefs in 2021, falling to 1–4.

==== Week 6: vs. Tennessee Titans ====
Week 6: Tennessee Titans at Las Vegas Raiders – Game summary

Quarter	1	2	3	4	Total
Titans	0	0	3	7	**10**
**Raiders**	3	7	7	3	**20**

at Allegiant Stadium, Paradise, Nevada

- Date: October 12
- Game time: 1:05 p.m. PDT
- Game weather: None (indoor stadium)
- Game attendance: 61,981
- Referee: Carl Cheffers
- TV announcers (Fox): Kenny Albert, Jonathan Vilma and Megan Olivi
- Recap, Game Book

Game information

**First quarter**

- LV – Daniel Carlson 50-yard field goal, 4:07. Raiders 3–0. **Drive: 13 plays, 48 yards, 8:44.**

**Second quarter**

- LV – Michael Mayer 4-yard pass from Geno Smith (Daniel Carlson kick), 5:13. Raiders 10–0. **Drive: 3 plays, 2 yards, 0:55.**

**Third quarter**

- LV – Ashton Jeanty 3-yard run (Daniel Carlson kick), 7:04. Raiders 17–0. **Drive: 13 plays, 70 yards, 7:56.**
- TEN – Matthew Wright 46-yard field goal, 1:06. Raiders 17–3. **Drive: 8 plays, 51 yards, 5:58.**

**Fourth quarter**

- LV – Daniel Carlson 29-yard field goal, 7:14. Raiders 20–3. **Drive: 8 plays, 60 yards, 5:32.**
- TEN – David Martin-Robinson 1-yard pass from Cam Ward (Matthew Wright kick), 3:03. Raiders 20–10. **Drive: 12 plays, 65 yards, 4:11.**

**Top passers**

- TEN – Cam Ward – 26/38, 222 yards, TD, INT
- LV – Geno Smith – 17/23, 174 yards, TD, INT

**Top rushers**

- TEN – Tony Pollard – 10 rushes, 34 yards
- LV – Ashton Jeanty – 23 rushes, 75 yards, TD

**Top receivers**

- TEN – Van Jefferson – 4 receptions, 75 yards
- LV – Tre Tucker – 5 receptions, 70 yards

Both offenses struggled, combining for just 2.39 yards per play in the first half, the lowest in an NFL game since Baltimore and Jacksonville averaged 1.80 yards per play on October 24, 2011. This was the Raiders' first win against the Titans since 2017 when they were based in Oakland, as well as their first win against them at home since 2004, again, when they were based in Oakland.

==== Week 7: at Kansas City Chiefs ====
Week 7: Las Vegas Raiders at Kansas City Chiefs – Game summary

Quarter	1	2	3	4	Total
Raiders	0	0	0	0	**0**
**Chiefs**	7	14	10	0	**31**

at Arrowhead Stadium, Kansas City, Missouri

- Date: October 19
- Game time: 12:00 p.m. CDT/10:00 a.m. PDT
- Game weather: Fair, 57 °F (14 °C)
- Game attendance: 73,584
- Referee: Clete Blakeman
- TV announcers (CBS): Jim Nantz, Tony Romo and Tracy Wolfson
- Recap, Game Book

Game information

**First quarter**

- KC – Rashee Rice 2-yard pass from Patrick Mahomes (Harrison Butker kick), 5:58. Chiefs 7–0. **Drive: 9 plays, 92 yards, 5:46.**

**Second quarter**

- KC – Hollywood Brown 8-yard pass from Patrick Mahomes (Harrison Butker kick), 9:17. Chiefs 14–0. **Drive: 17 plays, 84 yards, 8:40.**
- KC – Rashee Rice 3-yard pass from Patrick Mahomes (Harrison Butker kick), 0:10. Chiefs 21–0. **Drive: 16 plays, 94 yards, 6:22.**

**Third quarter**

- KC – Isiah Pacheco 7-yard run (Harrison Butker kick), 9:00. Chiefs 28–0. **Drive: 11 plays, 65 yards, 6:00.**
- KC – Harrison Butker 38-yard field goal, 2:36. Chiefs 31–0. **Drive: 9 plays, 66 yards, 4:26.**

**Fourth quarter**

- No scoring plays

**Top passers**

- LV – Geno Smith – 10/16, 67 yards
- KC – Patrick Mahomes – 26/35, 286 yards, 3 TD

**Top rushers**

- LV – Ashton Jeanty – 6 rushes, 21 yards
- KC – Isiah Pacheco – 15 rushes, 57 yards, TD

**Top receivers**

- LV – Tre Tucker – 5 receptions, 33 yards
- KC – Travis Kelce – 3 receptions, 54 yards

With their first shutout loss since 2023 the Raiders fell to 2–5, and extended their losing streak in Kansas City to 2 games, their losing streak to the Chiefs to 3 games, their losing streak to their fellow AFC West teams on the road to 4 games, and their losing streak to their fellow AFC West teams to 8 games. This is now the Raiders' 13th consecutive season not sweeping the Chiefs.

==== Week 9: vs. Jacksonville Jaguars ====
Week 9: Jacksonville Jaguars at Las Vegas Raiders – Game summary

Quarter	1	2	3	4	OT	Total
**Jaguars**	0	3	3	17	7	**30**
Raiders	0	6	3	14	6	**29**

at Allegiant Stadium, Paradise, Nevada

- Date: November 2
- Game time: 1:05 p.m. PST
- Game weather: None (indoor stadium)
- Game attendance: 62,080
- Referee: Alan Eck
- TV announcers (Fox): Chris Myers, Mark Schlereth and Kristina Pink
- Recap, Game Book

Game information

**First quarter**

- No scoring plays.

**Second quarter**

- LV – Brock Bowers 7-yard pass from Geno Smith (kick failed), 0:35. Raiders 6–0. **Drive: 13 plays, 95 yards, 5:04.**
- JAX – Cam Little 68-yard field goal, 0:00. Raiders 6–3. **Drive: 4 plays, 19 yards, 0:35.**

**Third quarter**

- JAX – Cam Little 33-yard field goal, 9:53. Tied 6–6. **Drive: 7 plays, 17 yards, 4:15.**
- LV – Daniel Carlson 24-yard field goal, 6:26. Raiders 9–6. **Drive: 8 plays, 37 yards, 3:27.**

**Fourth quarter**

- JAX – Trevor Lawrence 7-yard run (Cam Little kick), 14:50. Jaguars 13–9. **Drive: 13 plays, 69 yards, 6:36.**
- LV – Ashton Jeanty 15-yard pass from Geno Smith (Daniel Carlson kick), 9:38. Raiders 16–13. **Drive: 9 plays, 69 yards, 5:12.**
- JAX – Bhayshul Tuten 1-yard run (Cam Little kick), 4:06. Jaguars 20–16. **Drive: 9 plays, 74 yards, 5:32.**
- LV – Brock Bowers 27-yard pass from Geno Smith (Daniel Carlson kick), 1:52. Raiders 23–20. **Drive: 5 plays, 62 yards, 2:14.**
- JAX – Cam Little 48-yard field goal, 0:16. Tied 23–23. **Drive: 8 plays, 42 yards, 1:36.**

**Overtime**

- JAX – Trevor Lawrence 1-yard run (Cam Little kick), 3:24. Jaguars 30–23. **Drive: 10 plays, 44 yards, 6:36.**
- LV – Brock Bowers 2-yard pass from Geno Smith (pass failed), 0:16. Jaguars 30–29. **Drive: 8 plays, 45 yards, 3:08.**

**Top passers**

- JAX – Trevor Lawrence – 23/34, 220 yards, INT
- LV – Geno Smith – 29/39, 284 yards, 4 TD, INT

**Top rushers**

- JAX – Travis Etienne – 22 rushes, 84 yards
- LV – Ashton Jeanty – 13 rushes, 42 yards

**Top receivers**

- JAX – Parker Washington – 8 receptions, 90 yards
- LV – Brock Bowers – 12 receptions, 127 yards, 3 TD

The Raiders took a 23–20 lead with less than two minutes remaining. However, they allowed the Jaguars to march down the field, and Jacksonville kicker Cam Little, who had made a 68-yard field goal on the final play of the first half to set a new NFL record, converted a 48-yard field goal to send the game into overtime. Although the Jaguars scored a touchdown on their opening drive in overtime, the new overtime rules allowed the Raiders to respond. They marched down the field and scored a touchdown with 16 seconds left when Geno Smith connected with Brock Bowers for a 2-yard score. Opting to go for a two-point conversion to win the game, Smith’s pass was batted down by Jaguars nose tackle DaVon Hamilton, sealing a one-point loss for the Raiders. With the overtime loss, Las Vegas fell to 2–6 and 1–2 against the AFC South.

==== Week 10: at Denver Broncos ====
Week 10: Las Vegas Raiders at Denver Broncos – Game summary

Quarter	1	2	3	4	Total
Raiders	7	0	0	0	**7**
**Broncos**	0	7	3	0	**10**

at Empower Field at Mile High, Denver, Colorado

- Date: November 6
- Game time: 6:15 p.m. MST/5:15 p.m. PST
- Game weather: Partly cloudy, 60 °F (16 °C)
- Game attendance: 74,692
- Referee: Bill Vinovich
- TV announcers (Prime Video): Al Michaels, Kirk Herbstreit and Kaylee Hartung
- Recap, Game Book

Game information

**First quarter**

- LV – Ashton Jeanty 4-yard run (Daniel Carlson kick), 3:02. Raiders 7–0. **Drive: 8 plays, 41 yards, 4:05.**

**Second quarter**

- DEN – Troy Franklin 7-yard pass from Bo Nix (Wil Lutz kick), 2:41. Tied 7–7. **Drive: 5 plays, 53 yards, 3:17.**

**Third quarter**

- DEN – Wil Lutz 32-yard field goal, 0:05. Broncos 10–7. **Drive: 4 plays, -2 yards, 1:24.**

**Fourth quarter**

- No scoring plays

**Top passers**

- LV – Geno Smith – 16/26, 143 yards, INT
- DEN – Bo Nix – 16/28, 150 yards, TD, 2 INT

**Top rushers**

- LV – Ashton Jeanty – 19 rushes, 60 yards, TD
- DEN – J. K. Dobbins – 18 rushes, 77 yards

**Top receivers**

- LV – Tyler Lockett – 5 receptions, 44 yards
- DEN – Pat Bryant – 1 reception, 43 yards

With their third consecutive loss to the Broncos, the Raiders fell to 2–7 and extended their losing streak against their fellow AFC West teams to nine games, their losing streak in Denver to two games, and their losing streak against their fellow AFC West teams on the road to five games.

==== Week 11: vs. Dallas Cowboys ====
Week 11: Dallas Cowboys at Las Vegas Raiders – Game summary

Quarter	1	2	3	4	Total
**Cowboys**	3	21	7	2	**33**
Raiders	6	3	0	7	**16**

at Allegiant Stadium, Paradise, Nevada

- Date: November 17
- Game time: 5:15 p.m. PST
- Game weather: None (indoor stadium)
- Game attendance: 62,625
- Referee: Brad Allen
- TV announcers (ESPN/ABC): Joe Buck, Troy Aikman, Lisa Salters and Laura Rutledge
- Recap, Game Book

Game information

**First quarter**

- LV – Daniel Carlson 35-yard field goal, 7:55. Raiders 3–0. **Drive: 4 plays, -2 yards, 1:16.**
- DAL – Brandon Aubrey 50-yard field goal, 5:36. Tied 3–3. **Drive: 7 plays, 37 yards, 2:19.**
- LV – Daniel Carlson 45-yard field goal, 2:02. Raiders 6–3. **Drive: 7 plays, 46 yards, 3:34.**

**Second quarter**

- DAL – CeeDee Lamb 18-yard pass from Dak Prescott (Brandon Aubrey kick), 14:51. Cowboys 10–6. **Drive: 6 plays, 68 yards, 2:11.**
- DAL – Jake Ferguson 5-yard pass from Dak Prescott (Brandon Aubrey kick), 5:16. Cowboys 17–6. **Drive: 12 plays, 79 yards, 6:33.**
- DAL – George Pickens 37-yard pass from Dak Prescott (Brandon Aubrey kick), 1:11. Cowboys 24–6. **Drive: 4 plays, 69 yards, 1:14.**
- LV – Daniel Carlson 38-yard field goal, 0:00. Cowboys 24–9. **Drive: 9 plays, 50 yards, 1:10.**

**Third quarter**

- DAL – Ryan Flournoy 2-yard pass from Dak Prescott (Brandon Aubrey kick), 6:19. Cowboys 31–9. **Drive: 12 plays, 80 yards, 7:07.**

**Fourth quarter**

- LV – Tre Tucker 6-yard pass from Geno Smith (Daniel Carlson kick), 13:22. Cowboys 31–16. **Drive: 14 plays, 62 yards, 7:57.**
- DAL – Ashton Jeanty loss of 1-yard for a safety, 11:39. Cowboys 33–16.

**Top passers**

- DAL – Dak Prescott – 25/33, 268 yards, 4 TD
- LV – Geno Smith – 27/42, 238 yards, TD, INT

**Top rushers**

- DAL – Javonte Williams – 22 rushes, 93 yards
- LV – Geno Smith – 4 rushes, 14 yards

**Top receivers**

- DAL – George Pickens – 9 receptions, 144 yards, TD
- LV – Brock Bowers – 7 receptions, 72 yards

With the loss, the Raiders fell to 2–8 and 0–2 against the NFC East. Both teams paid tribute to Cowboys' defensive end Marshawn Kneeland, who died by apparent suicide on November 6.

==== Week 12: vs. Cleveland Browns ====
Week 12: Cleveland Browns at Las Vegas Raiders – Game summary

Quarter	1	2	3	4	Total
**Browns**	14	0	0	10	**24**
Raiders	0	3	0	7	**10**

at Allegiant Stadium, Paradise, Nevada

- Date: November 23
- Game time: 1:05 p.m. PST
- Game weather: None (indoor stadium)
- Game attendance: 62,244
- Referee: Shawn Hochuli
- TV announcers (CBS): Tom McCarthy, Ross Tucker and Tiffany Blackmon
- Recap, Game Book

Game information

**First quarter**

- CLE – Quinshon Judkins 8-yard run (Andre Szmyt kick), 8:24. Browns 7–0. **Drive: 2 plays, 13 yards, 0:48.**
- CLE – Quinshon Judkins 2-yard run (Andre Szmyt kick), 0:48. Browns 14–0. **Drive: 5 plays, 73 yards, 2:22.**

**Second quarter**

- LV – Daniel Carlson 41-yard field goal, 9:12. Browns 14–3. **Drive: 4 plays, 3 yards, 2:08.**

**Third quarter**

- No scoring plays

**Fourth quarter**

- CLE – Andre Szmyt 53-yard field goal, 12:08. Browns 17–3. **Drive: 8 plays, 44 yards, 3:45.**
- CLE – Dylan Sampson 66-yard pass from Shedeur Sanders (Andre Szmyt kick), 8:18. Browns 24–3. **Drive: 3 plays, 67 yards, 1:03.**
- LV – Ashton Jeanty 5-yard pass from Geno Smith (Daniel Carlson kick), 5:11. Browns 24–10. **Drive: 7 plays, 65 yards, 3:07.**

**Top passers**

- CLE – Shedeur Sanders – 11/20, 209 yards, TD, INT
- LV – Geno Smith – 30/44, 285 yards, TD

**Top rushers**

- CLE – Quinshon Judkins – 16 rushes, 47 yards, 2 TD
- LV – Ashton Jeanty – 17 rushes, 50 yards

**Top receivers**

- CLE – Dylan Sampson – 2 receptions, 59 yards, TD
- LV – Tyler Lockett – 4 receptions, 62 yards

The Raiders' offensive line struggled again, allowing ten sacks. The loss eliminated the Raiders from contention for the AFC West title for the 23rd consecutive year.

Offensive coordinator Chip Kelly was fired hours after the game and replaced by quarterbacks coach Greg Olson.

==== Week 13: at Los Angeles Chargers ====
Week 13: Las Vegas Raiders at Los Angeles Chargers – Game summary

Quarter	1	2	3	4	Total
Raiders	0	7	0	7	**14**
**Chargers**	7	0	14	10	**31**

at SoFi Stadium, Inglewood, California

- Date: November 30
- Game time: 1:25 p.m. PST
- Game weather: Cloudy, 64 °F (18 °C) (fixed roof)
- Game attendance: 71,018
- Referee: Alex Moore
- TV announcers (CBS): Andrew Catalon, Charles Davis, Jason McCourty and AJ Ross
- Recap, Game Book

Game information

**First quarter**

- LAC – Quentin Johnston 10-yard pass from Justin Herbert (Cameron Dicker kick), 4:21. Chargers 7–0. **Drive: 14 plays, 74 yards, 8:50.**

**Second quarter**

- LV – Brock Bowers 6-yard pass from Geno Smith (Daniel Carlson kick), 1:50. Tied 7–7. **Drive: 9 plays, 82 yards, 4:42.**

**Third quarter**

- LAC – Kimani Vidal 59-yard run (Cameron Dicker kick), 14:03. Chargers 14–7. **Drive: 3 plays, 67 yards, 0:57.**
- LAC – Ladd McConkey 7-yard pass from Justin Herbert (Cameron Dicker kick), 2:23. Chargers 21–7. **Drive: 8 plays, 60 yards, 5:02.**

**Fourth quarter**

- LAC – Cameron Dicker 56-yard field goal, 14:49. Chargers 24–7. **Drive: 4 plays, 4 yards, 1:02.**
- LV – Brock Bowers 6-yard pass from Geno Smith (Daniel Carlson kick), 7:49. Chargers 24–14. **Drive: 13 plays, 65 yards, 7:00.**
- LAC – Jaret Patterson 2-yard run (Cameron Dicker kick), 1:55. Chargers 31–14. **Drive: 13 plays, 68 yards, 5:54.**

**Top passers**

- LV – Geno Smith – 18/23, 165 yards, 2 TD, INT
- LAC – Justin Herbert – 15/20, 151 yards, 2 TD, INT

**Top rushers**

- LV – Ashton Jeanty – 15 rushes, 31 yards
- LAC – Kimani Vidal – 25 rushes, 126 yards, TD

**Top receivers**

- LV – Brock Bowers – 4 receptions, 63 yards, 2 TD
- LAC – Ladd McConkey – 4 receptions, 39 yards, TD

With the loss, the Raiders fell to 2–10 and extended their losing streak to the Chargers on the road to five games, their losing streak to the Chargers regardless of location to four games, their losing streak to their fellow AFC West opponents on the road to six games, and their losing streak to their fellow AFC West teams to 10 games. They failed to qualify for the playoffs for the fourth consecutive season.

==== Week 14: vs. Denver Broncos ====
Week 14: Denver Broncos at Las Vegas Raiders – Game summary

Quarter	1	2	3	4	Total
**Broncos**	7	7	7	3	**24**
Raiders	7	0	0	10	**17**

at Allegiant Stadium, Paradise, Nevada

- Date: December 7
- Game time: 1:05 p.m. PST
- Game weather: None (indoor stadium)
- Game attendance: 62,442
- Referee: Shawn Smith
- TV announcers (CBS): Andrew Catalon, Charles Davis, Jason McCourty and AJ Ross
- Recap, Game Book

Game information

**First quarter**

- DEN – Bo Nix 8-yard run (Wil Lutz kick), 6:06. Broncos 7–0. **Drive: 14 plays, 81 yards, 8:54.**
- LV – Brock Bowers 15-yard pass from Geno Smith (Daniel Carlson kick), 0:00. Tied 7–7. **Drive: 10 plays, 70 yards, 6:06.**

**Second quarter**

- DEN – Marvin Mims 48-yard punt return (Wil Lutz kick), 6:29. Broncos 14–7.

**Third quarter**

- DEN – RJ Harvey 3-yard run (Wil Lutz kick), 4:05. Broncos 21–7. **Drive: 14 plays, 91 yards, 9:13.**

**Fourth quarter**

- DEN – Wil Lutz 23-yard field goal, 3:56. Broncos 24–7. **Drive: 19 plays, 90 yards, 10:17.**
- LV – Shedrick Jackson 25-yard pass from Kenny Pickett (Daniel Carlson kick), 2:17. Broncos 24–14. **Drive: 6 plays, 65 yards, 1:39.**
- LV – Daniel Carlson 46-yard field goal, 0:00. Broncos 24–17. **Drive: 6 plays, 44 yards, 0:58.**

**Top passers**

- DEN – Bo Nix – 31/38, 212 yards
- LV – Geno Smith – 13/21, 116 yards, TD

**Top rushers**

- DEN – RJ Harvey – 17 rushes, 75 yards, TD
- LV – Ashton Jeanty – 10 rushes, 30 yards

**Top receivers**

- DEN – Courtland Sutton – 6 receptions, 62 yards
- LV – Jack Bech – 6 receptions, 50 yards

With their 11th consecutive divisional loss, the Raiders fell to 2–11. This marked the first time since 2013–2014 the Raiders were swept by Denver in back-to-back years. This game is notable for the Raiders opting to kick a field goal with 5 seconds left, and down 14-24 to put them up by 3.

==== Week 15: at Philadelphia Eagles ====
Week 15: Las Vegas Raiders at Philadelphia Eagles – Game summary

Quarter	1	2	3	4	Total
Raiders	0	0	0	0	**0**
**Eagles**	7	10	7	7	**31**

at Lincoln Financial Field, Philadelphia, Pennsylvania

- Date: December 14
- Game time: 1:00 p.m. EST/10:00 a.m. PST
- Game weather: Sunny, 30 °F (−1 °C)
- Game attendance: 69,879
- Referee: Clay Martin
- TV announcers (Fox): Joe Davis, Greg Olsen and Pam Oliver
- Recap, Game Book

Game information

**First quarter**

- PHI – Dallas Goedert 4-yard pass from Jalen Hurts (Jake Elliott kick), 7:51. Eagles 7–0. **Drive: 13 plays, 67 yards, 7:09.**

**Second quarter**

- PHI – Jake Elliott 27-yard field goal, 12:49. Eagles 10–0. **Drive: 7 plays, 59 yards, 3:27.**
- PHI – Saquon Barkley 2-yard run (Jake Elliott kick), 1:57. Eagles 17–0. **Drive: 11 plays, 70 yards, 6:07.**

**Third quarter**

- PHI – Dallas Goedert 4-yard pass from Jalen Hurts (Jake Elliott kick), 4:52. Eagles 24–0. **Drive: 10 plays, 73 yards, 6:27.**

**Fourth quarter**

- PHI – A. J. Brown 27-yard pass from Jalen Hurts (Jake Elliott kick), 14:54. Eagles 31–0. **Drive: 5 plays, 60 yards, 2:49.**

**Top passers**

- LV – Kenny Pickett – 15/25, 64 yards, INT
- PHI – Jalen Hurts – 12/15, 175 yards, 3 TD

**Top rushers**

- LV – Ashton Jeanty – 9 rushes, 35 yards
- PHI – Saquon Barkley – 22 rushes, 78 yards, TD

**Top receivers**

- LV – Brock Bowers – 6 receptions, 28 yards
- PHI – Dallas Goedert – 6 receptions, 70 yards, 2 TD

The Raiders’ offense was shut out by the Eagles’ defense in their second shutout loss of the season. They secured a last place finish in the AFC West for the second consecutive season.

Las Vegas was limited to 75 total yards, their fewest since gaining 58 yards against the San Diego Chargers in the 1961 season. The game lasted just two hours and 31 minutes, the fastest game in franchise history, and the second fastest game on NFL record, behind a 1996 meeting between the Chargers and Colts that took 2 hours and 29 minutes to finish.

==== Week 16: at Houston Texans ====
Week 16: Las Vegas Raiders at Houston Texans – Game summary

Quarter	1	2	3	4	Total
Raiders	0	7	7	7	**21**
**Texans**	7	6	3	7	**23**

at NRG Stadium, Houston, Texas

- Date: December 21
- Game time: 3:25 p.m. CST/1:25 p.m. PST
- Game weather: None (retractable roof closed)
- Game attendance: 71,160
- Referee: Scott Novak
- TV announcers (CBS): Andrew Catalon, Charles Davis, Jason McCourty and AJ Ross
- Recap, Game Book

Game information

**First quarter**

- HOU – Derek Stingley Jr. 31-yard interception return (Ka'imi Fairbairn kick), 10:43. Texans 7–0.

**Second quarter**

- LV – Brock Bowers 7-yard pass from Geno Smith (Daniel Carlson kick), 12:25. Tied 7–7. **Drive: 7 plays, 61 yards, 3:40.**
- HOU – Ka'imi Fairbairn 55-yard field goal, 9:12. Texans 10–7. **Drive: 7 plays, 35 yards, 3:13.**
- HOU – Ka'imi Fairbairn 50-yard field goal, 0:50. Texans 13–7. **Drive: 11 plays, 57 yards, 4:29.**

**Third quarter**

- LV – Ashton Jeanty 60-yard pass from Geno Smith (Daniel Carlson kick), 9:44. Raiders 14–13. **Drive: 6 plays, 85 yards, 3:28.**
- HOU – Ka'imi Fairbairn 49-yard field goal, 3:08. Texans 16–14. **Drive: 5 plays, 22 yards, 2:53.**

**Fourth quarter**

- HOU – Dalton Schultz 1-yard pass from C. J. Stroud (Ka'imi Fairbairn kick), 7:41. Texans 23–14. **Drive: 10 plays, 88 yards, 5:54.**
- LV – Ashton Jeanty 51-yard run (Daniel Carlson kick), 5:24. Texans 23–21. **Drive: 5 plays, 65 yards, 2:17.**

**Top passers**

- LV – Geno Smith – 16/23, 201 yards, 2 TD, INT
- HOU – C. J. Stroud – 23/35, 187 yards, TD

**Top rushers**

- LV – Ashton Jeanty – 24 rushes, 128 yards, TD
- HOU – Jawhar Jordan – 15 rushes, 53 yards

**Top receivers**

- LV – Ashton Jeanty – 1 reception, 60 yards, TD
- HOU – Nico Collins – 4 receptions, 59 yards

With their ninth straight loss, the Raiders fell to 2–13, tied with the Giants for the worst record in the NFL, and finished 1–3 against the AFC South. They also finished 1–7 on the road. This marked the first time in franchise history the Raiders had back-to-back seasons with at least 13 losses.

==== Week 17: vs. New York Giants ====
Week 17: New York Giants at Las Vegas Raiders – Game summary

Quarter	1	2	3	4	Total
**Giants**	7	10	10	7	**34**
Raiders	0	3	7	0	**10**

at Allegiant Stadium, Paradise, Nevada

- Date: December 28
- Game time: 1:05 p.m. PST
- Game weather: None (indoor stadium)
- Game attendance: 62,021
- Referee: Land Clark
- TV announcers (CBS): Kevin Harlan, Trent Green and Melanie Collins
- Recap, Game Book

Game information

**First quarter**

- NYG – Devin Singletary 1-yard run (Ben Sauls kick), 0:00. Giants 7–0. **Drive: 5 plays, 44 yards, 2:36.**

**Second quarter**

- LV – Daniel Carlson 42-yard field goal, 9:41. Giants 7–3. **Drive: 9 plays, 35 yards, 5:19.**
- NYG – Jaxson Dart 12-yard run (Ben Sauls kick), 5:56. Giants 14–3. **Drive: 8 plays, 65 yards, 3:45.**
- NYG – Ben Sauls 32-yard field goal, 0:00. Giants 17–3. **Drive: 8 plays, 65 yards, 3:45.**

**Third quarter**

- NYG – Ben Sauls 23-yard field goal, 7:17. Giants 20–3. **Drive: 11 plays, 72 yards, 4:35.**
- LV – Tyler Lockett 4-yard pass from Geno Smith (Daniel Carlson kick), 0:31. Giants 20–10. **Drive: 14 plays, 65 yards, 6:46.**
- NYG – Deonte Banks 95-yard kickoff return (Ben Sauls kick), 0:18. Giants 27–10.

**Fourth quarter**

- NYG – Jaxson Dart 2-yard run (Ben Sauls kick), 3:40. Giants 34–10. **Drive: 15 plays, 75 yards, 8:49.**

**Top passers**

- NYG – Jaxson Dart – 22/30, 207 yards
- LV – Geno Smith – 20/28, 176 yards, TD, 2 INT

**Top rushers**

- NYG – Tyrone Tracy Jr. – 14 rushes, 62 yards
- LV – Ashton Jeanty – 16 rushes, 60 yards

**Top receivers**

- NYG – Wan'Dale Robinson – 11 receptions, 113 yards
- LV – Michael Mayer – 9 receptions, 89 yards

Both teams entered the game with matching 2–13 records and nine-game losing streaks, marking the fourth time that the two teams with the league’s worst outright records have met in the final two weeks of a season. The previous occurrence came in 1981, when the 1–14 Baltimore Colts faced the 2–13 New England Patriots.

With the loss, the Raiders fell to 2–14 for the first time since 2006 and finished 0–5 against the NFC.

==== Week 18: vs. Kansas City Chiefs ====
Week 18: Kansas City Chiefs at Las Vegas Raiders – Game summary

Quarter	1	2	3	4	Total
Chiefs	3	0	3	6	**12**
**Raiders**	0	6	0	8	**14**

at Allegiant Stadium, Paradise, Nevada

- Date: January 4
- Game time: 1:25 p.m. PST
- Game weather: None (indoor stadium)
- Game attendance: 61,780
- Referee: Craig Wrolstad
- TV announcers (CBS): Chris Lewis, Kyle Long and Tiffany Blackmon
- Recap, Game Book

Game information

**First quarter**

- KC – Harrison Butker 36-yard field goal, 4:58. Chiefs 3–0. **Drive: 8 plays, 36 yards, 3:33.**

**Second quarter**

- LV – Daniel Carlson 32-yard field goal, 7:20. Tied 3–3. **Drive: 8 plays, 30 yards, 4:17.**
- LV – Daniel Carlson 23-yard field goal, 1:52. Raiders 6–3. **Drive: 4 plays, 13 yards, 1:05.**

**Third quarter**

- KC – Harrison Butker 40-yard field goal, 4:11. Tied 6–6. **Drive: 12 plays, 50 yards, 7:33.**

**Fourth quarter**

- LV – Daniel Carlson 55-yard field goal, 13:16. Raiders 9–6. **Drive: 10 plays, 29 yards, 5:55.**
- LV – Shane Buechele sacked in the end zone for a safety, 4:37. Raiders 11–6.
- KC – Harrison Butker 47-yard field goal, 3:33. Raiders 11–9. **Drive: 4 plays, -8 yards, 0:57.**
- KC – Harrison Butker 41-yard field goal, 1:01. Chiefs 12–11. **Drive: 5 plays, 51 yards, 1:22.**
- LV – Daniel Carlson 60-yard field goal, 0:08. Raiders 14–12. **Drive: 5 plays, 26 yards, 0:53.**

**Top passers**

- KC – Shane Buechele – 7/14, 88 yards
- LV – Aidan O'Connell – 10/22, 102 yards

**Top rushers**

- KC – Brashard Smith – 12 rushes, 56 yards
- LV – Ashton Jeanty – 26 rushes, 87 yards

**Top receivers**

- KC – Hollywood Brown – 3 receptions, 64 yards
- LV – Michael Mayer – 3 receptions, 47 yards

The Raiders clinched the first overall pick in the draft following the Giants’ victory over the Cowboys. Daniel Carlson kicked a 60-yard field goal with eight seconds remaining to give the Raiders a win, snapping both a 10-game losing streak and an 11-game division losing streak. The victory also marked their first win against the Chiefs at Allegiant Stadium. The Raiders ended their season at 3–14 (1–5 against the AFC West) and they finished 2–7 at home.

The following day, the Raiders fired head coach Pete Carroll.

=== Standings ===
==== Division ====
AFC West
	W	L	T	PCT	DIV	CONF	PF	PA	STK
^{(1)} Denver Broncos	14	3	0	.824	5–1	9–3	401	311	W2
^{(7)} Los Angeles Chargers	11	6	0	.647	5–1	8–4	368	340	L2
Kansas City Chiefs	6	11	0	.353	1–5	3–9	362	328	L6
Las Vegas Raiders	3	14	0	.176	1–5	3–9	241	432	W1

==== Conference ====
AFC
Seed	Team	Division	W	L	T	PCT	DIV	CONF	SOS	SOV	STK
**Division leaders**
1 (Note: Denver finished ahead of New England based on common games (Denver 6–0 to New England 5–1 against: Cincinnati, Las Vegas, NY Giants, NY Jets and Tennessee).)	Denver Broncos	West	14	3	0	.824	5–1	9–3	.422	.378	W2
2	New England Patriots	East	14	3	0	.824	5–1	9–3	.391	.370	W3
3	Jacksonville Jaguars	South	13	4	0	.765	5–1	10–2	.478	.425	W8
4	Pittsburgh Steelers	North	10	7	0	.588	4–2	8–4	.503	.453	W1
**Wild cards**
5 (Note: Houston finished ahead of Buffalo based on head-to-head victory.)	Houston Texans	South	12	5	0	.706	5–1	10–2	.522	.441	W9
6	Buffalo Bills	East	12	5	0	.706	4–2	9–3	.471	.412	W1
7	Los Angeles Chargers	West	11	6	0	.647	5–1	8–4	.469	.425	L2
**Did not qualify for the postseason**
8 (Note: Indianapolis finished ahead of Baltimore based on conference record (Indianapolis 6–6 to Baltimore 5–7).)	Indianapolis Colts	South	8	9	0	.471	2–4	6–6	.540	.382	L7
9	Baltimore Ravens	North	8	9	0	.471	3–3	5–7	.507	.408	L1
10	Miami Dolphins	East	7	10	0	.412	3–3	3–9	.488	.378	L1
11 (Note: Cincinnati finished ahead of Kansas City based on conference record (Cincinnati 5–7 to Kansas City 3–9).)	Cincinnati Bengals	North	6	11	0	.353	3–3	5–7	.521	.451	L1
12	Kansas City Chiefs	West	6	11	0	.353	1–5	3–9	.514	.363	L6
13	Cleveland Browns	North	5	12	0	.294	2–4	4–8	.486	.418	W2
14 (Note: Las Vegas finished ahead of NY Jets and Tennessee based on conference record (Las Vegas 3–9 to NY Jets 2–10 and Tennessee 2–10).)	Las Vegas Raiders	West	3	14	0	.176	1–5	3–9	.538	.451	W1
15 (Note: NY Jets finished ahead of Tennessee based on strength of victory (NY Jets .373 to Tennessee .275).)	New York Jets	East	3	14	0	.176	0–6	2–10	.552	.373	L5
16	Tennessee Titans	South	3	14	0	.176	0–6	2–10	.574	.275	L2
**Tiebreakers** (Note: When breaking ties for three or more teams under the NFL's rules, they are first broken within divisions, then comparing only the highest ranked remaining team from each division.)
