= Jack Bech =

American football player (born 2002)

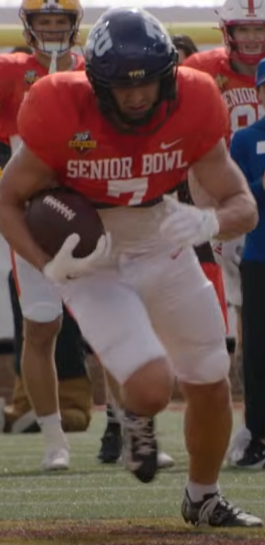
- Bech at the 2025 Senior Bowl

No. 18 – Las Vegas Raiders
- Position: Wide receiver
- Roster status: Active

Personal information
- Born: December 18, 2002 (age 23)
- Listed height: 6 ft 1 in (1.85 m)
- Listed weight: 214 lb (97 kg)

Career information
- High school: St. Thomas More Catholic (Lafayette, Louisiana)
- College: LSU (2021–2022); TCU (2023–2024)
- NFL draft: 2025: 2nd round, 58th overall pick

Career history
- Las Vegas Raiders (2025–present)

Awards and highlights
- Second-team All-Big 12 (2024)

Career NFL statistics as of 2025
- Receptions: 20
- Receiving yards: 224
- Receiving touchdowns: 1
- Stats at Pro Football Reference

Jack Bech (BESH; born December 18, 2002) is an American professional football wide receiver for the Las Vegas Raiders of the National Football League (NFL). He played college football for the LSU Tigers and TCU Horned Frogs. Bech was selected by the Raiders in the second round of the 2025 NFL draft.

== Early life ==
Bech attended St. Thomas More Catholic High School in Lafayette, Louisiana. He was rated at a four-star recruit and held offers from schools such as LSU, Mississippi State, Notre Dame, Texas, TCU, and Vanderbilt. Initially, Bech committed to play college football for the Vanderbilt Commodores before flipping to the LSU Tigers.

== College career ==
=== LSU ===
As a freshman at Louisiana State University in 2021, Bech appeared in all 13 games for the LSU Tigers, making seven starts and recording 43 receptions for 489 yards and three touchdowns. In week 4 of the 2022 season, he hauled in six receptions for 43 yards in a win over New Mexico. Bech finished the season with 16 receptions for 200 yards and a touchdown before entering the NCAA transfer portal.

=== TCU ===
Bech transferred to Texas Christian University. During his first season with the Horned Frogs in 2023, he played in eight games, tallying 12 receptions for 146 yards.

During the 2024 season, Bech enjoyed a breakout season. He played in all 12 games, catching 62 passes for 1,034 yards and nine touchdowns.

On December 19, 2024, Bech announced his declaration for the 2025 NFL draft. Bech played in the 2025 Senior Bowl, and impressed NFL scouts with his performance. On the final play of the Senior Bowl, Bech caught a game-winning touchdown pass from Seth Henigan. He finished the game with six catches for 68 yards and a touchdown, and was named the game's Most Valuable Player.

=== Statistics ===
Year	Team	Games		Receiving			
Year	Team	GP	GS	Rec	Yds	Avg	TD
2021	LSU	13	7	43	489	11.4	3
2022	LSU	12	4	16	200	12.5	1
2023	TCU	8	0	12	146	12.2	0
2024	TCU	12	12	62	1,034	16.7	9
Career		45	23	133	1,869	14.1	13

== Professional career ==
Pre-draft measurables
Height	Weight	Arm length	Hand span	Wingspan	20-yard shuttle	Three-cone drill	Vertical jump	Broad jump	Bench press
6 ft 1 1/4 in (1.86 m)	214 lb (97 kg)	31 1/2 in (0.80 m)	9 in (0.23 m)	6 ft 3 in (1.91 m)	4.21 s	6.84 s	34.5 in (0.88 m)	10 ft 5 in (3.18 m)	19 reps
All values from NFL Combine

Bech was selected by the Las Vegas Raiders with the 58th overall pick in the second round of the 2025 NFL draft. In Bech’s rookie season with the Raiders, he appeared in 16 games, catching 20 passes for 224 yards.

In Week 1 of the 2026 season against the Miami Dolphins, Bech recorded his first career touchdown on a 15–yard reception from Kirk Cousins.

== NFL career statistics ==
Year	Team	Games		Receiving					Tackles		
Year	Team	GP	GS	Rec	Yds	Avg	Lng	TD	Cmb	Solo	Ast
2025	LV	16	5	20	224	11.2	37	0	2	1	1
Career		16	5	20	224	11.2	37	0	2	1	1

== Personal life ==
Bech's older brother, former Princeton wide receiver Tiger Bech, was killed in the 2025 New Orleans truck attack. His uncle, Brett Bech, played in the NFL for the New Orleans Saints from 1997 to 1999.

Bech is Catholic. Bech and his uncle presented the ceremonial coin at Super Bowl LIX on February 9, 2025.
