= Don Morgan (American football) =

American football player (born 1975)

No. 31, 47
- Position: Defensive back

Personal information
- Born: September 18, 1975 (age 51); Stockton, California, U.S.
- Listed height: 5 ft 11 in (1.80 m)
- Listed weight: 202 lb (92 kg)

Career information
- High school: Manteca
- College: Nevada
- NFL draft: 1999: undrafted

Career history
- Minnesota Vikings (1999–2001); Arizona Cardinals (2002)
- Stats at Pro Football Reference

Don N. Morgan (born September 18, 1975) is an American former professional football player who was a defensive back for the Minnesota Vikings and Arizona Cardinals of the National Football League (NFL). He played college football for the Nevada Wolf Pack.

Morgan's wife is Sandra Douglass Morgan, who is president of the Las Vegas Raiders.
