= Cody Lindenberg =

American football player (born 2002)

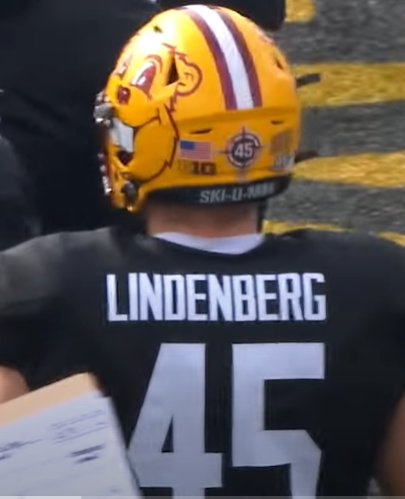
- Lindenberg at the 2025 Senior Bowl

No. 55 – Las Vegas Raiders
- Position: Linebacker
- Roster status: Active

Personal information
- Born: January 15, 2002 (age 24); Anoka, Minnesota, U.S.
- Listed height: 6 ft 2 in (1.88 m)
- Listed weight: 236 lb (107 kg)

Career information
- High school: Anoka (MN)
- College: Minnesota (2020–2024)
- NFL draft: 2025: 7th round, 222nd overall pick

Career history
- Las Vegas Raiders (2025–present)

Awards and highlights
- 2× First-team All-Big Ten (2023, 2024)

Career NFL statistics as of 2025
- Total tackles: 7
- Stats at Pro Football Reference

Cody Lindenberg (born January 15, 2002) is an American professional football linebacker for the Las Vegas Raiders of the National Football League (NFL). He played college football for the Minnesota Golden Gophers and was selected by the Raiders in the seventh round of the 2025 NFL draft.

== Early life ==
Lindenberg attended Anoka High School in Anoka, Minnesota, and was rated as a three-star recruit before receiving his only offer from Minnesota. In May 2019, Lindenberg committed to play college football for the Minnesota Golden Gophers.

== College career ==
During his first four collegiate seasons from 2020 through 2023, Lindenberg appeared in 26 games, where he notched 115 tackles with eight being for a loss, a sack, and two pass deflections, for the Golden Gophers. He suffered a hamstring injury in the 2023 preseason, limiting him to four games that year. In week ten of the 2024 season, Lindenberg notched ten tackles in a win over Nebraska.

== Professional career ==
Pre-draft measurables
Height	Weight	Arm length	Hand span	Wingspan	40-yard dash	10-yard split	20-yard split	20-yard shuttle	Three-cone drill	Vertical jump	Broad jump	Bench press
6 ft 2 3/8 in (1.89 m)	236 lb (107 kg)	32 3/4 in (0.83 m)	9 in (0.23 m)	6 ft 5 5/8 in (1.97 m)	4.73 s	1.69 s	2.68 s	4.32 s	7.01 s	36.5 in (0.93 m)	9 ft 10 in (3.00 m)	20 reps
All values from NFL Combine/Pro Day

Lindenberg was selected by the Las Vegas Raiders with the 222nd pick in the seventh round of the 2025 NFL draft.

== NFL career statistics ==
=== Regular season ===
Year	Team	Games		Tackles					Interceptions						Fumbles				
Year	Team	GP	GS	Cmb	Solo	Ast	Sck	TFL	Int	Yds	Avg	Lng	TD	PD	FF	Fum	FR	Yds	TD
2025	LV	17	0	7	4	3	0.0	0	0	0	0.0	0	0	0	0	0	0	0	0
Career		17	0	7	4	3	0.0	0	0	0	0.0	0	0	0	0	0	0	0	0
