= Greedy Vance Jr. =

American football player (born 2001)

No. 22 – Las Vegas Raiders
- Position: Cornerback
- Roster status: Practice squad

Personal information
- Born: October 8, 2001 (age 25); Kenner, Louisiana, U.S.
- Listed height: 5 ft 9 in (1.75 m)
- Listed weight: 177 lb (80 kg)

Career information
- High school: Edna Karr (New Orleans, Louisiana)
- College: Louisville (2020–2021); Florida State (2022–2023); USC (2024)
- NFL draft: 2025: undrafted

Career history
- Las Vegas Raiders (2025–present)

Career NFL statistics as of 2025
- Total tackles: 8
- Pass deflections: 1
- Stats at Pro Football Reference

Greedy Vance Jr. (born October 8, 2001) is an American professional football cornerback for the Las Vegas Raiders of the National Football League (NFL). He played college football for the Louisville Cardinals, Florida State Seminoles, and USC Trojans.

== Early life ==
Vance Jr. attended Edna Karr High School in New Orleans, Louisiana. Coming out of high school, he was rated as a three-star recruit and committed to play college football for the Louisville Cardinals over other offers such as Auburn, Mississippi State, Arkansas, Arizona State, and Virginia.

== College career ==
=== Louisville ===
As a freshman in 2020, Vance Jr. recorded one tackle in five games played. In 2021 he played in 12 games with nine starts, where he recorded 36 tackles with one being for a loss, seven pass deflections, and a forced fumble. After the season, Vance Jr. entered his name into the NCAA transfer portal.

=== Florida State ===
Vance Jr. transferred to play for the Florida State. In week 4 of the 2022 season, he recorded his first career interception in a victory over Boston College. In the 2022 season, Vance Jr. recorded 16 tackles, five pass deflections, and three interceptions. During the 2023 season, he notched 18 tackles, three pass deflections, and an interception in 14 games. After the year, Vance Jr. entered his name into the NCAA transfer portal.

=== USC ===
Vance Jr. transferred to play for the USC Trojans. In week 12 of the 2024 season, he notched an interception in a 28-20 win versus Nebraska Cornhuskers. Vance Jr. finished the 2024 season, playing in 11 games with six starts, recording 29 tackles with one being for a loss two pass deflections, after which he declared for the NFL draft.

== Professional career ==
Pre-draft measurables
Height	Weight	Arm length	Hand span	Wingspan	40-yard dash	10-yard split	20-yard split	20-yard shuttle	Three-cone drill	Vertical jump	Broad jump	Bench press
5 ft 9 7/8 in (1.77 m)	182 lb (83 kg)	30 1/8 in (0.77 m)	8 in (0.20 m)	6 ft 0 3/8 in (1.84 m)	4.64 s	1.59 s	2.68 s	4.20 s	7.09 s	34.0 in (0.86 m)	10 ft 7 in (3.23 m)	13 reps
All values from Pro Day

After not being selected in the 2025 NFL draft, Vance signed with the Las Vegas Raiders as an undrafted free agent. He was waived on August 26 as part of final roster cuts and re-signed to the practice squad the next day. Vance was promoted to the active roster on December 2.

On August 30, 2026, Vance was waived by the Raiders as a part of final roster cuts; he was re-signed to the team's practice squad the following day.

== NFL career statistics ==
=== Regular season ===
Year	Team	Games		Tackles					Interceptions						Fumbles				
Year	Team	GP	GS	Cmb	Solo	Ast	Sck	TFL	Int	Yds	Avg	Lng	TD	PD	FF	Fum	FR	Yds	TD
2025	LV	6	0	8	7	1	0.0	0	0	0	0.0	0	0	1	0	0	0	0	0
Career		6	0	8	7	1	0.0	0	0	0	0.0	0	0	1	0	0	0	0	0
