= Carter Runyon =

American football player (born 2001)

No. 84 – Las Vegas Raiders
- Position: Tight end
- Roster status: Practice squad

Personal information
- Born: July 23, 2001 (age 25); Fairfax, Virginia, U.S.
- Listed height: 6 ft 4 in (1.93 m)
- Listed weight: 243 lb (110 kg)

Career information
- High school: Oakton (Vienna, Virginia)
- College: Shenandoah (2021–2022); Towson (2023–2024)
- NFL draft: 2025: undrafted

Career history
- Las Vegas Raiders (2025–present)

Career NFL statistics as of 2025
- Receptions: 1
- Receiving yards: 3
- Stats at Pro Football Reference

Carter Runyon (born July 23, 2001) is an American professional football tight end for the Las Vegas Raiders of the National Football League (NFL). He played college football for the Shenandoah Hornets and Towson Tigers.

== Early life and college career ==
Runyon was born on July 23, 2001, and grew up in Fairfax, Virginia. He attended Oakton High School in Vienna, where he played football as an offensive lineman, earning first-team all-conference and all-region honors. He weighed 300 pounds (140 kg) at the time and after high school, began playing college football for the NCAA Division III-level Shenandoah Hornets as an offensive tackle. He played at that position as a freshman at Shenandoah in 2021, earning third-team All-Old Dominion Athletic Conference (ODAC) honors for his performance. He dropped his weight to 250 pounds (110 kg) and changed his position to tight end in 2022. That year, he was named second-team All-ODAC after posting 16 receptions for 161 yards and a touchdown.

Runyon transferred to the NCAA Division I FCS-level Towson Tigers in 2023. In his first year there, he was his team's leading receiver with 43 catches for 549 yards and four touchdowns. He led the Colonial Athletic Association (CAA) in receiving yards for a tight end and was named first-team All-CAA. He was also chosen second-team FCS All-American, becoming the first All-American at tight end in Towson history. He then caught 45 passes for 502 yards and five touchdowns as a senior in 2024, earning first-team All-CAA and first-team All-America honors. He was invited to the Hula Bowl at the conclusion of his collegiate career.

== Professional career ==
Pre-draft measurables
Height	Weight	Arm length	Hand span	Wingspan	40-yard dash	10-yard split	20-yard split	20-yard shuttle	Three-cone drill	Vertical jump	Broad jump	Bench press
6 ft 4 5/8 in (1.95 m)	243 lb (110 kg)	32 7/8 in (0.84 m)	10 in (0.25 m)	6 ft 9 3/8 in (2.07 m)	4.63 s	1.64 s	2.69 s	4.20 s	7.20 s	36.5 in (0.93 m)	10 ft 3 in (3.12 m)	22 reps
All values from Pro Day

After going unselected in the 2025 NFL draft, Runyon signed with the Las Vegas Raiders as an undrafted free agent. He caught six passes for 74 yards in preseason. He was waived on August 26, 2025, then re-signed to the practice squad the following day. He was elevated to the active roster for the team's Week 4 game against the Chicago Bears and made his NFL debut in the game, appearing on 15 special teams snaps. On September 30, Runyon was signed to the active roster.

On August 30, 2026, Runyon was placed on injured reserve. On November 5, he was waived and re-signed to the practice squad the next day.

== NFL career statistics ==
=== Regular season ===
Year	Team	Games		Receiving					Tackles			Fumbles				
Year	Team	GP	GS	Rec	Yds	Avg	Lng	TD	Cmb	Solo	Ast	FF	Fum	FR	Yds	TD
2025	LV	13	0	1	3	3.0	3	0	2	2	0	0	0	0	0	0
Career		13	0	1	3	3.0	3	0	2	2	0	0	0	0	0	0
