= Tonka Hemingway =

American football player (born 2001)

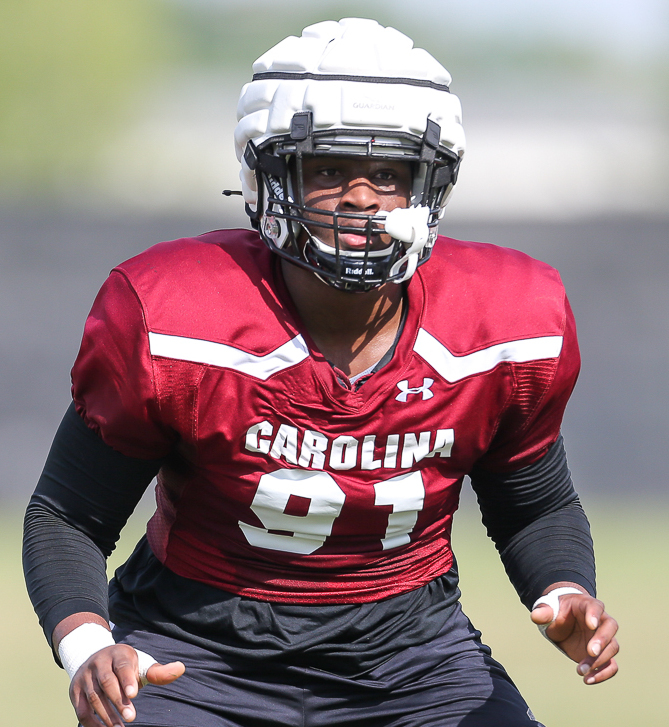
- Hemingway with the South Carolina Gamecocks in 2021

No. 97 – Las Vegas Raiders
- Position: Defensive tackle
- Roster status: Active

Personal information
- Born: October 31, 2001 (age 25); Conway, South Carolina, U.S.
- Listed height: 6 ft 2 in (1.88 m)
- Listed weight: 284 lb (129 kg)

Career information
- High school: Conway (SC)
- College: South Carolina (2020–2024)
- NFL draft: 2025: 4th round, 135th overall pick

Career history
- Las Vegas Raiders (2025–present)

Career NFL statistics as of 2025
- Tackles: 9
- Sacks: 4
- Fumble recoveries: 1
- Pass deflections: 1
- Stats at Pro Football Reference

Terrell H. "Tonka" Hemingway (born October 31, 2001) is an American professional football defensive tackle for the Las Vegas Raiders of the National Football League (NFL). He played college football for the South Carolina Gamecocks and was selected by the Raiders in the fourth round of the 2025 NFL draft.

== Early life ==
Hemingway was born on October 31, 2001 in Conway, South Carolina. He attended Conway High School, where he lettered in football, basketball and baseball. As a senior, he notched 92 tackles with 24 being for a loss. Coming out of high school, Hemingway committed to play college football for the South Carolina Gamecocks.

== College career ==
During the 2020 season, Hemingway tallied 16 tackles with one being for a loss, two pass deflections, and a forced fumble. In the 2021 season, he played in six games and had six tackles. In 2022, Hemingway tallied 33 tackles with eight being for a loss, four sacks, a pass deflection, and two fumble recoveries. In week 12 of the 2023 season, he had the game-winning fumble recovery against Kentucky. Hemingway finished the season making 32 tackles with four and a half being for a loss, a sack and a half, seven pass deflections, and two fumble recoveries.

== Professional career ==
Pre-draft measurables
Height	Weight	Arm length	Hand span	Wingspan	40-yard dash	10-yard split	20-yard split	20-yard shuttle	Three-cone drill	Vertical jump	Broad jump
6 ft 2 7/8 in (1.90 m)	284 lb (129 kg)	33 in (0.84 m)	9 in (0.23 m)	6 ft 8 3/4 in (2.05 m)	5.01 s	1.89 s	2.87 s	4.48 s	7.36 s	32.0 in (0.81 m)	9 ft 4 in (2.84 m)
All values from NFL Combine/Pro Day

Hemingway was selected by the Las Vegas Raiders in the fourth round (135th overall) at the 2025 NFL draft.

== NFL career statistics ==
=== Regular season ===
Year	Team	Games		Tackles					Interceptions						Fumbles				
Year	Team	GP	GS	Cmb	Solo	Ast	Sck	TFL	Int	Yds	Avg	Lng	TD	PD	FF	Fum	FR	Yds	TD
2025	LV	9	0	9	8	1	4.0	5	0	0	0.0	0	0	1	0	0	1	0	0
Career		9	0	9	8	1	4.0	5	0	0	0.0	0	0	1	0	0	1	0	0

== Personal life ==
Hemingway is the younger brother of former NFL wide receiver, Junior Hemingway.
