= Chigozie Anusiem =

American football player (born 2000)

No. 29 – Las Vegas Raiders
- Position: Cornerback
- Roster status: Injured reserve

Personal information
- Born: November 5, 2000 (age 26); La Habra, California, U.S.
- Listed height: 6 ft 1 in (1.85 m)
- Listed weight: 200 lb (91 kg)

Career information
- High school: Sonora (La Habra)
- College: California (2018–2021); Colorado State (2022–2023)
- NFL draft: 2024: undrafted

Career history
- Washington Commanders (2024)*; Cleveland Browns (2024); Arizona Cardinals (2025)*; Las Vegas Raiders (2025–present)
- * Offseason or practice squad member only

Career NFL statistics as of 2025
- Tackles: 1
- Stats at Pro Football Reference

Chigozie Anusiem (born November 5, 2000) is an American professional football cornerback for the Las Vegas Raiders of the National Football League (NFL). He played college football for the California Golden Bears and Colorado State Rams and signed with the Washington Commanders as an undrafted free agent in 2024.

== Early life ==
Anusiem was born on November 5, 2000, in La Habra, California. He was the fourth of five children and the son of immigrants from Nigeria. He grew up in California and started playing football at age six. He attended Sonora High School in La Habra where he participated in football and track and field. With the football team, he won three varsity letters and was a two-way player at defensive back and wide receiver.

Anusiem moved from safety to cornerback as a sophomore and won a starting role. He was named second-team All-League as a junior and helped Sonora reach the state playoffs as a senior, posting 30 receptions for 605 yards and 13 touchdowns along with 35 tackles and four interceptions that year. A three-star recruit, he committed to play college football for the California Golden Bears.

== College career ==
As a freshman in 2018, he redshirted, appearing in two games while posting no statistics. The following year, he appeared in 12 games, one as a starter, and tallied 15 tackles and five passes defended. In the COVID-19-shortened 2020 season, he played in four games, two as a starter, making 12 tackles. He played in seven games in 2021, missing five games, and made 13 tackles, before entering the NCAA transfer portal in November. He concluded his tenure with the Golden Bears having made 40 tackles and six pass breakups in 25 games played, six of which he started.

After receiving his degree, Anusiem initially transferred to the Hawaii Rainbow Warriors to continue his career. However, after the resignation of Todd Graham four days after his commitment, he opted to re-enter the transfer portal. He ended up transferring to the Colorado State Rams. In his first season there, 2022, he posted 36 tackles and nine pass breakups, being named honorable mention All-Mountain West Conference (MWC). As a senior in 2023, he totaled 57 tackles, 2.5 tackles-for-loss (TFLs), three passes defended and an interception, while being named honorable mention All-MWC for the second time. He was invited to the 2024 East–West Shrine Bowl at the conclusion of his collegiate career.

== Professional career ==
Pre-draft measurables
Height	Weight	Arm length	Hand span	Wingspan	40-yard dash	10-yard split	20-yard split	20-yard shuttle	Three-cone drill	Vertical jump	Broad jump	Bench press
6 ft 1 1/8 in (1.86 m)	200 lb (91 kg)	32 1/4 in (0.82 m)	8 5/8 in (0.22 m)	6 ft 7 in (2.01 m)	4.40 s	1.57 s	2.49 s	4.42 s	7.06 s	37.5 in (0.95 m)	10 ft 4 in (3.15 m)	14 reps
All values from Pro Day

=== Washington Commanders ===
Anusiem signed with the Washington Commanders as an undrafted free agent on April 29, 2024. He was waived by the Commanders on August 27, then was re-signed to the team's practice squad the following day.

=== Cleveland Browns ===
Anusiem was signed off the Commanders' practice squad to the active roster of the Cleveland Browns on November 13, 2024.

On August 24, 2025, Anusiem was waived by the Browns.

=== Arizona Cardinals ===
On August 28, 2025, Anusiem signed with the Arizona Cardinals' practice squad.

=== Las Vegas Raiders ===
On December 9, 2025, Anusiem was signed by the Las Vegas Raiders off of the Cardinals' practice squad.

On August 22, 2026, Anusiem was placed on season–ending injured reserve due to knee and leg injuries suffered in the team's preseason matchup against the Houston Texans.

== NFL career statistics ==
Legend
**Bold**	Career high

=== Regular season ===
Year	Team	Games		Tackles					Interceptions						Fumbles				
Year	Team	GP	GS	Cmb	Solo	Ast	Sck	TFL	Int	Yds	Avg	Lng	TD	PD	FF	Fum	FR	Yds	TD
2024	CLE	1	0	0	0	0	0.0	0	0	0	0.0	0	0	0	0	0	0	0	0
2025	LV	**3**	0	**1**	0	**1**	0.0	0	0	0	0.0	0	0	0	0	0	0	0	0
Career		4	0	1	0	1	0.0	0	0	0	0.0	0	0	0	0	0	0	0	0
