= John Spytek =

American football player and executive (born 1980)

Las Vegas Raiders
- Title: General manager

Personal information
- Born: August 1980 (age 46)
- Listed height: 6 ft 4 in (1.93 m)
- Listed weight: 240 lb (109 kg)

Career information
- Position: Outside linebacker
- High school: Catholic Memorial (Waukesha, Wisconsin)
- College: Michigan (1999–2002)
- NFL draft: 2003: undrafted

Career history
- Detroit Lions (2004) Operations intern; Philadelphia Eagles (2005–2009); Intern (2005); College scouting assistant (2006); College/pro scout (2007–2009); Cleveland Browns (2010–2012) Director of college scouting; Denver Broncos (2013–2015); Southwest area scout (2013); National scout (2014–2015); Tampa Bay Buccaneers (2016–2024); Director of player personnel (2016–2020); Vice president of player personnel (2021–2022); Assistant general manager (2023–2024); Las Vegas Raiders (2025–present) General manager

Awards and highlights
- 2× Super Bowl champion (50, LV)

John F. Spytek (born August 1980) is an American professional football executive and former player who is the general manager for the Las Vegas Raiders of the National Football League (NFL). He played college football for the Michigan Wolverines and has previously worked with the Detroit Lions, Philadelphia Eagles, Cleveland Browns, Denver Broncos and Tampa Bay Buccaneers.

== Early life ==
Spytek was born in August 1980 and grew up in Pewaukee, Wisconsin. He attended Catholic Memorial High School in Waukesha, where he played football and was a two-way end, being a starter for three years. He was first-team all-league on defense and second-team all-league on offense as a senior. After high school, Spytek attended the University of Michigan, where he played from 1999 to 2002 as an outside linebacker, posting 18 tackles as a sophomore and finishing with 37 tackles in his collegiate career. He was mainly used on special teams and did not record a start in his tenure with the Wolverines. As a freshman at Michigan, he was teammates with Tom Brady, who was then a senior.

Spytek graduated from Michigan with a bachelor's degree in general studies and later received a master's degree in sports management.

== Executive career ==
After developing an interest in scouting, Spytek began his career in 2004, working as an intern in the operations department for the Detroit Lions. The following year, he joined the Philadelphia Eagles as an intern for the pro personnel department. He then served as a college scouting assistant for the Eagles in 2006 before then being a college/pro scout from 2007 to 2009. He followed general manager Tom Heckert Jr. to the Cleveland Browns in 2010 and was named the team's director of college scouting. He worked three seasons for the Browns but was fired following the 2012 season along with Heckert and several other executives.

In 2013, Spytek joined the Denver Broncos as a Southwest area scout, and he was promoted the following year to national scout. He was a member of the Broncos' Super Bowl 50 championship team. In 2016, he was hired by the Tampa Bay Buccaneers as director of player personnel. He contributed to the team's acquisition of Tom Brady in 2020, who had been Spytek's college teammate more than 20 years prior. The Tampa Bay Times described it as "the biggest free agent acquisition in franchise history," and the Buccaneers won Super Bowl LV that year. He was promoted to vice president of player personnel in 2021. He received another promotion, to assistant general manager, in 2023.

=== Las Vegas Raiders ===
On January 24, 2025, the Las Vegas Raiders hired Spytek to be their general manager.

== Personal life ==
Spytek and his wife, Kristen, had three children. Their first child, Evelyn, died aged 21 months as a result of cytomegalovirus. Spytek and his wife later founded the National CMV Foundation to raise awareness of the disease.
