= Conner McQueen =

American football coach (born 1993)

Las Vegas Raiders
- Title: Offensive quality control coach

Personal information
- Born: August 27, 1993 (age 33); Klein, Texas, U.S.
- Listed height: 5 ft 10 in (1.78 m)
- Listed weight: 175 lb (79 kg)

Career information
- Position: Quarterback
- High school: Klein Oak
- College: Texas A&M (2012–2016)

Career history
- Texas A&M (2017) Offensive quality control coach; UCLA (2018–2019) Graduate assistant; Oklahoma (2020–2021) Offensive assistant; USC (2022) Graduate assistant; Incarnate Word (2023–2024) Offensive coordinator & quarterbacks coach; Las Vegas Raiders (2025–present) Offensive quality control coach

Conner McQueen (born August 27, 1993) is an American football coach and former player who is currently an offensive quality control coach for the Las Vegas Raiders of the National Football League (NFL). He recently served as the offensive coordinator and quarterbacks coach for Incarnate Word.

== Playing career ==
McQueen grew up in Klein, Texas and attended Klein Oak High School, where he played baseball and was the starting quarterback on the football team. He had offers from some Division II programs, but instead opted to enroll at Texas A&M and join the football team as a walk-on.

McQueen redshirted his true freshman season with the Texas A&M and became the Aggies' holder on field goals towards the end of his redshirt freshman season. As a quarterback, he completed one pass for one yard and rushed twice for eight yards over the course on his college career.

== Coaching career ==
McQueen began his coaching career as an offensive quality control coach at Texas A&M in 2017. He took a graduate assistant position at UCLA the following season. McQueen was hired as an offensive assistant on the staff of head coach Lincoln Riley at Oklahoma in 2022. He followed Riley after he was hired to coach USC in 2023, taking a graduate assistant position.

McQueen was hired as the offensive coordinator at Incarnate Word on January 13, 2023.
