= Rob Leonard =

American football player and coach (born 1985)

Las Vegas Raiders
- Title: Defensive coordinator

Personal information
- Born: June 14, 1985 (age 41)

Career information
- Position: Linebacker (No. 34)
- High school: Moon Area (Moon Township, Pennsylvania)
- College: Washington & Jefferson (2004); NC State (2005–2008)

Career history
- Cardinal Gibbons HS (2009) Defensive assistant; NC State (2010–2012) Graduate assistant; New York Giants (2013–2016) Defensive assistant; New York Giants (2017) Assistant defensive line coach; New York Giants (2018) Assistant linebackers coach; Miami Dolphins (2019) Linebackers coach; Miami Dolphins (2020) Assistant defensive line coach; Miami Dolphins (2021) Outside linebackers coach; Baltimore Ravens (2022) Outside linebackers coach; Las Vegas Raiders (2023–2024) Defensive line coach; Las Vegas Raiders (2025) Defensive line coach & run game coordinator; Las Vegas Raiders (2026–present) Defensive coordinator
- Coaching profile at Pro Football Reference

Robert Leonard (born June 14, 1985) is an American professional football coach who is the defensive coordinator for the Las Vegas Raiders of the National Football League (NFL). He previously served as the defensive line coach for the Raiders from 2023 to 2025.

Leonard played college football at NC State as a linebacker and safety from 2005 to 2008 and has previously served as an assistant coach for NC State, the New York Giants, Miami Dolphins and Baltimore Ravens.

== Early life ==
Leonard attended Moon Area High School in Moon Township, Pennsylvania, where he played as a cornerback, running back, kick returner and punter. During his time there, he earned first-team All-Conference honors as a cornerback and he also earned second-team all-state honors at cornerback.

From 2005 to 2008, Leonard played at North Carolina State University as a safety and linebacker, having initially joined the team as a walk-on before earning a scholarship following his freshman season at Washington & Jefferson College. In 2008, he led the Wolfpack with 95 tackles and earned the team's Mike Hardy Award, given annually to the player who plays beyond his capabilities.

== Coaching career ==
=== Early career ===
In 2009, Leonard began his coaching career as a defensive assistant at Cardinal Gibbons High School in Raleigh, North Carolina. He then served as a graduate assistant at North Carolina State University from 2010 to 2012.

=== New York Giants ===
In 2013, Leonard was hired by the New York Giants as their defensive assistant under head coach Tom Coughlin. In 2016, he was retained under head coach Ben McAdoo.

On March 3, 2017, Leonard was promoted by the Giants as their assistant linebackers coach.

On February 15, 2018, Leonard was retained by the Giants and promoted to assistant linebackers coach under head coach Pat Shurmur.

=== Miami Dolphins ===
On February 8, 2019, Leonard was hired by the Miami Dolphins as their linebackers coach under head coach Brian Flores. In 2020, Leonard was named the assistant defensive line coach and in 2021, he was promoted to outside linebackers coach.

=== Baltimore Ravens ===
On February 23, 2022, Leonard was hired by the Baltimore Ravens as their outside linebackers coach under head coach John Harbaugh.

=== Las Vegas Raiders ===
In 2023, Leonard was hired by the Las Vegas Raiders as their defensive line coach under head coach Josh McDaniels. In 2024, he was retained under head coach Antonio Pierce.

In 2025, Leonard was promoted by the Raiders as their defensive line coach and run game coordinator under head coach Pete Carroll.

On February 15, 2026, Leonard was promoted by the Raiders as their defensive coordinator under new head coach Klint Kubiak.

== Personal life ==
Leonard and his wife, Anna, have two sons and a daughter.
