= Sandra Douglass Morgan =

American attorney and sports executive (born 1978)

Las Vegas Raiders
- Title: President

Personal information
- Born: April 10, 1978 (age 48); Knob Noster, Missouri, U.S.

Career information
- College: University of Nevada, Las Vegas (William S. Boyd School of Law)

Career history
- Las Vegas Raiders (2022–present) President

Sandra Douglass Morgan (born April 10, 1978) is an American attorney and football executive who is the president of the Las Vegas Raiders of the National Football League. She is the first Black and Asian woman to serve as an NFL team president. Douglass Morgan previously served on the Nevada State Athletic Commission and was the chairwoman of the Nevada Gaming Control Board.

== Early life ==
Douglass Morgan's father, Gilbert, is a Black American retired United States Air Force veteran. Her mother, Kil Cha, is Korean.

== Education ==
Raised in Las Vegas, Douglass Morgan graduated from Eldorado High School, earned a bachelor's in political science and communication from the University of Nevada, Reno in 1999 before graduating from the University of Nevada, Las Vegas William S. Boyd School of Law with a Juris Doctor degree in 2003.

== Professional life ==
Initially a defense attorney, Douglass Morgan later became a litigation attorney for The Mirage from 2005 to 2008, was the city attorney for North Las Vegas from 2008 to 2016 becoming the first Black person to hold such a role in Nevada, and director of external affairs for AT&T Services from 2016 to 2019. Later she joined the Nevada State Athletic Commission, the Nevada Gaming Commission and later the Nevada Gaming Control Board in 2019, appointed by Governor Steve Sisolak, becoming the first Black chair. During her tenure she introduced reforms - as the proposal to require to gaming companies to establish written policies against harassment and discrimination towards their own employees based on factors such as sex, race, color, gender identity, and national origin - and was responsible for closing and reopening casinos during the COVID-19 pandemic. In this period she also served in the State COVID-19 task force.

After leaving the control board Douglass Morgan joined the board of Caesars Entertainment as well as the boards of Fidelity National Financial, Inc., Allegiant Airlines, and Cerberus Cyber Sentinel. Morgan joined the law firm of Covington & Burling LLP as counsel in November 2021 and also ran her own consulting service, Douglass Morgan LLC. In December 2021 Douglass Morgan was also named vice chair of Las Vegas’ host committee for Super Bowl LVIII, which took place at Allegiant Stadium in February 2024.

On July 7, 2022, the Las Vegas Raiders announced Douglass Morgan as the new team president. The hiring made her the first black and asian female team president in the National Football League. She is also the third woman and third African-American in NFL history to become a president of an NFL team.

== Personal life ==
Douglass Morgan is married to former Minnesota Vikings and Arizona Cardinals safety Don Morgan. The couple has two children.
