= Charles Grant (offensive tackle) =

American football player (born 2002)

No. 60 – Las Vegas Raiders
- Position: Offensive tackle
- Roster status: Active

Personal information
- Born: March 22, 2002 (age 24)
- Listed height: 6 ft 4 in (1.93 m)
- Listed weight: 304 lb (138 kg)

Career information
- High school: Churchland (Portsmouth, Virginia)
- College: William & Mary (2020–2024)
- NFL draft: 2025: 3rd round, 99th overall pick

Career history
- Las Vegas Raiders (2025–present)

Awards and highlights
- 2× First-team FCS All-American (2023, 2024); 2× First-team All-CAA (2022, 2023)

Career NFL statistics as of 2025
- Games played: 9
- Games started: 1
- Stats at Pro Football Reference

Charles Grant (born March 22, 2002) is an American professional football offensive tackle for the Las Vegas Raiders of the National Football League (NFL). He played college football for the William & Mary Tribe and was selected by the Raiders in the third round of the 2025 NFL draft.

== Early life ==
Grant attended Churchland High School in Portsmouth, Virginia. He committed to the College of William & Mary to play college football.

== College career ==
After entering his college career as a backup his first year in 2021, Grant became a starter the next season at left tackle and remained a starter throughout his career. In 2023, he was named a first team All-American. In 2024, he garnered six All America honors.

Grant was selected to play in the 2025 Senior Bowl.

== Professional career ==
Pre-draft measurables
Height	Weight	Arm length	Hand span	Wingspan	40-yard dash	10-yard split	20-yard split	20-yard shuttle	Three-cone drill	Vertical jump	Broad jump	Bench press
6 ft 4 7/8 in (1.95 m)	311 lb (141 kg)	34 3/4 in (0.88 m)	10 1/4 in (0.26 m)	6 ft 9 7/8 in (2.08 m)	5.09 s	1.80 s	2.95 s	4.95 s	7.88 s	27.0 in (0.69 m)	8 ft 11 in (2.72 m)	20 reps
All values from NFL Combine/Pro Day

Grant was selected by the Las Vegas Raiders with the 99th pick in the third round of the 2025 NFL draft.
