= History of the Las Vegas Raiders =

Sports team history

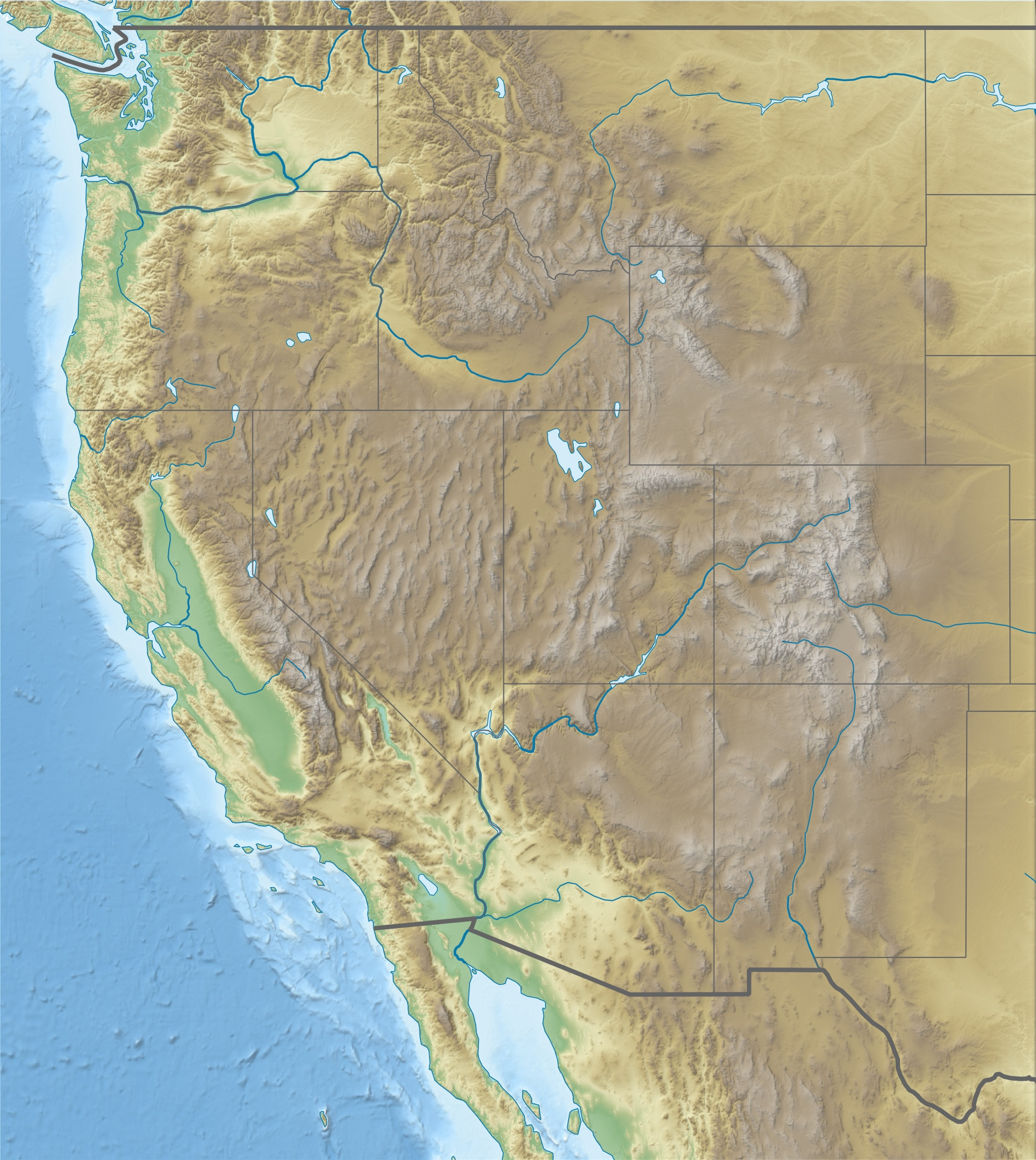
Home locations of the Raiders franchise throughout their history

The Las Vegas Raiders are a professional American football team based in the Las Vegas metropolitan area. The Raiders compete in the National Football League (NFL) as a member club of the league's American Football Conference (AFC) West division. The Raiders were founded in Oakland, California, in 1960 as a charter member of the American Football League. The franchise moved to Los Angeles in 1982 before moving back to Oakland in 1995 where they played until their move to Las Vegas in 2020. The Raiders won the 1967 AFL championship before joining the NFL as part of the AFL–NFL merger and have since won three Super Bowls in 1976, 1980, and 1983.

== First stint as the Oakland Raiders (1960–1981) ==
The Raiders began as one of the eight charter members of the American Football League (AFL) in 1960. It was in 1964 when the team first played in Las Vegas. On August 24, 1964, the team played the Houston Oilers in the first ever professional football game ever played in Las Vegas. The game was a preseason game at the original Cashman Field and was organized by Raiders general manager Al Davis and Wilbur Clark of the Desert Inn as a charity game to benefit 'Wilbur Clark's Cavalcade of Charities.' The game would be the beginning of a long relationship between the Davis family and Las Vegas. The Raiders won the game 53 to 49. The team became a part of the National Football League in 1970 as part of the AFL–NFL merger and have remained a member of the NFL ever since. They were part of the AFL's Western Division for their first ten years and became part of the American Football Conference upon their joining the NFL. During the team's first stint in Oakland it won Super Bowl XI and Super Bowl XV.

== Los Angeles Raiders (1982–1994) ==
In 1980 Al Davis attempted unsuccessfully to have improvements made to the Oakland–Alameda County Coliseum, specifically the addition of luxury boxes. That year, he signed a memorandum of agreement to move the Raiders from Oakland to Los Angeles. The move, which required three-fourths approval by league owners, was defeated 22–0 (with five owners abstaining). When Davis tried to move the team anyway, he was blocked by an injunction. In response, the Raiders not only became an active partner in an antitrust lawsuit filed by the Los Angeles Memorial Coliseum (who had recently lost the Los Angeles Rams to Anaheim), but filed an antitrust lawsuit of their own. After the first case was declared a mistrial, in May 1982, a second jury found in favor of Davis and the Los Angeles Coliseum, clearing the way for the move. With the ruling, the Raiders would relocate to Los Angeles for the 1982 season to play their home games at the Memorial Coliseum. The team won Super Bowl XVIII while in Los Angeles becoming the first team to deliver a Super Bowl to Los Angeles.

== Second stint as the Oakland Raiders (1995–2019) ==
In 1995, the Raiders returned to Oakland after the city and Alameda County agreed to build the luxury and club seats on to the Oakland Coliseum with a structure that would become known as Mount Davis. Davis chose to return the Raiders to Oakland after the Los Angeles Memorial Coliseum Commission failed to deliver on promised renovations to build luxury suites (the Coliseum would not have luxury suites until a 2019 renovation) and after he was unable to secure a new stadium in the Los Angeles area. The team appeared in Super Bowl XXXVII during its second stint in Oakland but lost to the Tampa Bay Buccaneers.

== Move to Las Vegas ==
The Davis family had been in search of a new stadium for the team since the late 1980s. Al Davis died on October 8, 2011, leaving his son Mark Davis with the task of finding a new stadium for the team. The Davis family had maintained a connection to Las Vegas going back to the game the Raiders played there in 1964. Al Davis often visited Las Vegas and sometimes considered moving the Raiders to the city. Davis spent many long weekends in the area staying at Caesars Palace, or at the Riviera and would take members of the team including coaches and former CEO Amy Trask on trips to Las Vegas. Mark Davis purchased LasVegasRaiders.com in 1998 and renewed the domain registration each year. The team started exploring moving to Las Vegas in 2015. After over 10 years of failure to secure a new stadium in Oakland or in the surrounding area to replace the decaying coliseum (issues of which include sewage backups and flooding) and after missing out on Los Angeles to the Los Angeles Rams and Los Angeles Chargers, on March 27, 2017, the NFL granted the team permission to relocate to Las Vegas. Ground was officially broken on the new stadium on November 13, 2017.

== Las Vegas Raiders (2020–present) ==
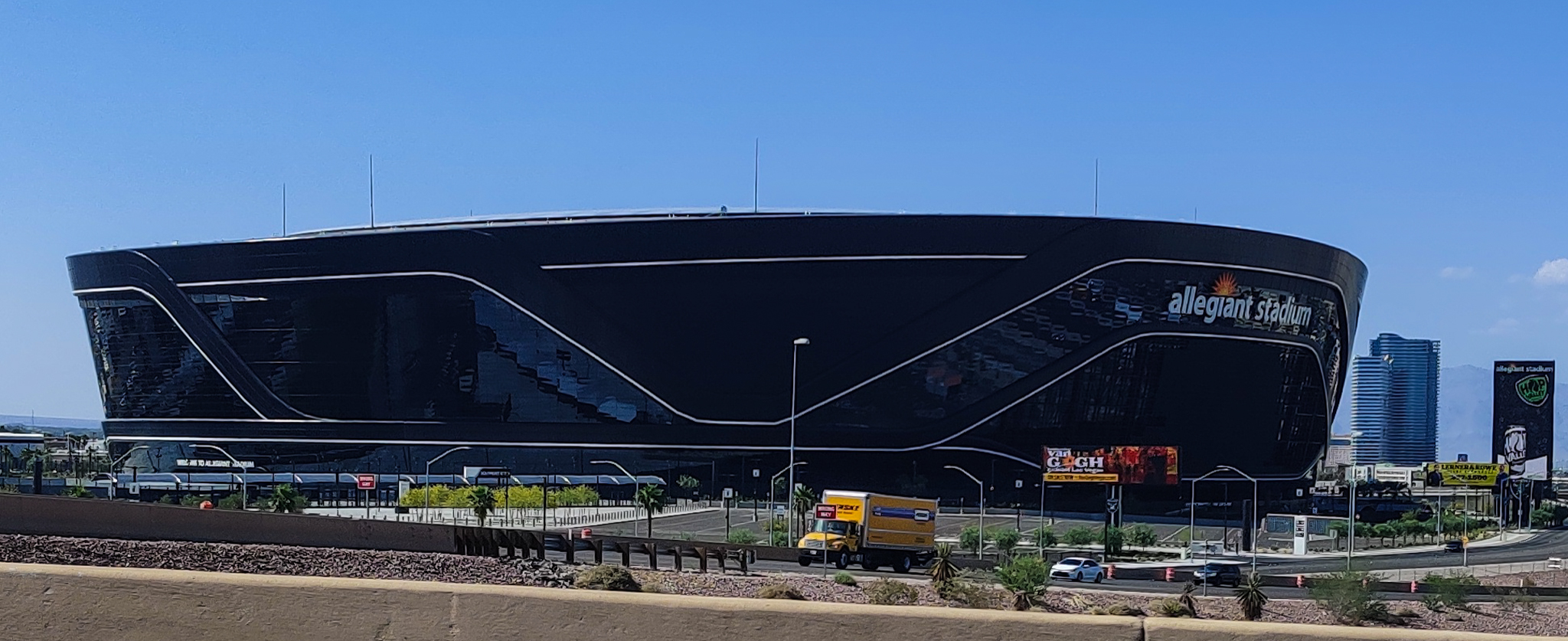
Allegiant Stadium, the current home of the Raiders

On January 22, 2020, after three lame duck seasons in Oakland, the team officially was declared the "Las Vegas Raiders" in a ceremony at the under-construction Allegiant Stadium.

On September 13, the team won their first game as the Las Vegas Raiders 34–30 over the Carolina Panthers. On September 21, the team won its first home game in Las Vegas defeating the New Orleans Saints 34–24. The Raiders ultimately finished 8–8 in their first season in Las Vegas, missing out on the playoffs after losing to the Miami Dolphins in week 16. Due to the COVID-19 pandemic, the Raiders did not allow fans into the stadium for games.

Las Vegas started the 2021 campaign 3–0 as fans were allowed at games once again. On October 11, head coach Jon Gruden, who was just over three years into his second stint with the team, resigned due to the publication of homophobic, misogynistic and racist emails that he sent prior to becoming the Raiders head coach. Special teams coach Rich Bisaccia was named the interim coach. Despite several incidents off the field that resulted in the arrests or terminations of players such as Henry Ruggs, Damon Arnette, and Nate Hobbs, the Raiders overcame a midseason slump and managed to make the postseason for the first time since 2016, beating the Los Angeles Chargers in the final seconds of overtime during a week 18 game. The Raiders made it into the playoffs with a record of 10–7 in the 2021 season. They lost to the eventual AFC champion Cincinnati Bengals in Paul Brown Stadium with a score of 26–19.

The Raiders hired Josh McDaniels as the Raiders next head coach on January 31, 2022. The 2022 season would be a disaster as the Raiders would finish with a 6–11 record. Throughout the season, the Raiders had suffered several blown leads, which included giving up leads by at least 17 points in three games. Nine of their 11 losses were all within one-possession. They became the first team in NFL history to lose five or more times in a season while leading by double-digits in the second half. This would also be the final season of Derek Carr as quarterback before getting traded to the New Orleans Saints the next season.

The 2023 season would go moderately well, but on October 31, 2023, after their week 8 loss to the Detroit Lions and a 3–5 start, the Raiders fired head coach Josh McDaniels and general manager Dave Ziegler. The Raiders hired interim head coach Antonio Pierce and interim general manager Champ Kelly. Two highlights occurred during Pierce's tenure is when the Raiders set a franchise record for most points scored in a game of 63 points in week 15 against the Los Angeles Chargers. The Raiders won the game 63–21. Another highlight is where the Raiders upset the defending and eventual Super Bowl champions Kansas City Chiefs 20–14 on Christmas Day. The Raiders improved on their record from last season, but they would miss the playoffs after their loss in week 17 to the Indianapolis Colts. They would later finish with an 8–9 record, good enough to finish at 2nd place in the AFC West.

On January 19, 2024, the Raiders announced that Antonio Pierce would be the team's next head coach.

However, the 2024 season would be Pierce's only full season as head coach after posing a 4–13 record that season. After starting 2–2 that season, the Raiders suffered a disastrous 10-game losing streak until the streak ended with a win over the Jacksonville Jaguars in Week 17. On January 7, 2025, the Raiders fired Antonio Pierce after his only full season with the Raiders.

On January 25, 2025, former USC and Seattle Seahawks coach Pete Carroll was hired as the head coach of the Raiders, departing Seattle after 15 years with the Seahawks organization. Upon coaching his first game for the Raiders, he became the oldest head coach (73) in NFL history. During the offseason, the Raiders traded for Geno Smith, reuniting Carroll with his former Seahawks quarterback. After one season with the Raiders, Carroll was fired on January 5, 2026, after leading the team to a 3–14 record.

On February 9, 2026, the Raiders hired Seattle Seahawks offensive coordinator Klint Kubiak as their next head coach, having recently won Super Bowl LX.

== See also ==
- Los Angeles Raiders
- Oakland Raiders
