= History of the NFL in Los Angeles =

The National Football League (NFL) has had a long and complicated history in Los Angeles, the second-largest media market in the United States, behind only New York City. Los Angeles became the first city on the West Coast to host an NFL team when the Cleveland Rams moved to Los Angeles in 1946; they played at the Los Angeles Memorial Coliseum from 1946 until 1979. In 1960, a charter American Football League franchise, the Los Angeles Chargers, began playing in the Coliseum. The Chargers moved to San Diego after their inaugural season, where they eventually joined the NFL as part of the AFL–NFL merger. The Rams moved to suburban Anaheim, California, in 1980. A surprising move in 1982 brought the Oakland Raiders to the Coliseum to become the Los Angeles Raiders.

A combination of a split fan base and the 1994 Northridge earthquake damage prompted both teams to leave Los Angeles before the 1995 season. The Raiders returned to their original home of Oakland while the Rams moved to St. Louis, Missouri. This left Los Angeles as the largest media market in the country without an NFL team for over 20 years—and enabled owners of smaller-market teams to threaten to move there unless their home city gave them money to improve or replace their stadium.

The league's absence from Los Angeles ended in early 2016, when the Rams received approval to return to the area beginning at the start of the 2016 season.

Los Angeles is now the home of the NFL's Los Angeles Rams and the Los Angeles Chargers, who announced their intent to return to Los Angeles from San Diego in January 2017. The two teams now share SoFi Stadium in Inglewood, which opened in 2020.

In addition to the NFL, Los Angeles has been represented by teams in almost every other high-level professional football league: the PCPFL's Los Angeles Bulldogs, the AAFC's Los Angeles Dons, the original 1960s AFL's Los Angeles Chargers (the same team that are currently in the NFL), the COFL's Orange County Ramblers, the WFL's Southern California Sun, the original USFL's Los Angeles Express, the Arena Football League's Anaheim Piranhas, Los Angeles Cobras, Los Angeles Avengers and LA KISS, and the Los Angeles Xtreme and LA Wildcats in both the original and second incarnations of the XFL.

== Origins of football in Los Angeles ==
The first NFL team to name itself after the city of Los Angeles was the Los Angeles Buccaneers in 1926. However, this was a road team, based in Chicago, made up of Californians, primarily University of California and University of Southern California alumni. Historian Michael McCambridge said that the Buccaneers became a road team because the Los Angeles Coliseum Commission had banned pro teams from its stadium. However, the difficulty of transcontinental travel in the era before modern air travel was likely also a major factor in the decision to base the team in the Midwest. The upstart American Football League (the first league to bear that name) also featured a similar Midwest-based road team of West Coast players, the Los Angeles Wildcats. Both Los Angeles teams performed respectably on the field but folded after their sole seasons in 1926 amid league-wide overextension. The teams played each other in what would be both franchise's final games in an exhibition in San Francisco in January 1927.

The first major professional football team to operate in Los Angeles were the Los Angeles Bulldogs, formed for the fall 1937 season in the second AFL, taking the place of the Cleveland Rams. They operated both as an independent and as a member of several other leagues from about 1937 to 1948. The Bulldogs played most of their tenure at Gilmore Stadium, a stadium on the site of what is now (CBS) Television City. The NFL would hold its first two All-Star Games in Los Angeles following the 1938 and 1939 seasons.

In 1946, the Los Angeles Dons of the All-America Football Conference started play, lasting four years before folding with the demise of the AAFC. In 1960, the American Football League (AFL) was formed, with a franchise at the region, the Los Angeles Chargers. After the inaugural season, the team moved to San Diego to become the San Diego Chargers, who joined the NFL during the AFL–NFL merger in 1970. The Continental Football League, a second-tier professional league active in the late 1960s, included the Orange County Ramblers among its teams (as well as, for one game, the Long Beach Admirals).

== NFL in Los Angeles: 1946–1994 ==
=== Los Angeles Rams ===
In 1946, the defending NFL champions, the Cleveland Rams moved to Los Angeles. The other league owners were not pleased with the move, but the league relented due in large part to concern that Los Angeles could potentially become the nucleus of a rival league. The Rams played home games at the Los Angeles Memorial Coliseum, at the time shared with two NCAA teams – the USC Trojans and the UCLA Bruins – and an AAFC franchise, the Los Angeles Dons. It was the establishment of the Rams in Los Angeles that prompted the league to lift its moratorium on African-American players that had been in place since the early 1930s: terms of the Rams' lease on the Coliseum required the team to integrate, and to do so, the Rams signed former UCLA stars Kenny Washington and Woody Strode. When the AAFC folded in 1950, the Dons went out of business, but the AAFC's San Francisco 49ers were admitted to the NFL. This provided the NFL with a workable pair of West Coast cities for travel.

Another AAFC franchise which moved over to the NFL in 1950 was the Cleveland Browns, who were based in the city the Rams had deserted. The Browns and the Rams met in three NFL championship games in six seasons—in Cleveland in 1950 (Browns won 30–28) and in Los Angeles in 1951 (Rams won 24–17) and 1955 (Browns won 38–14).

The Rams quickly became established as an NFL power, winning 7 straight NFC West titles from 1973 to 1979, with top quarterbacks like Roman Gabriel and the legendary Fearsome Foursome, consisting of Rosey Grier, Lamar Lundy, Merlin Olsen and Deacon Jones.

==== Rams move to Anaheim ====
By 1979 the Rams were a successful franchise, and made it to their first Super Bowl that year. However, they had long been dissatisfied with the Los Angeles Memorial Coliseum. For most of the Rams' tenure there, it was the largest stadium in the NFL, with over 90,000 seats. However, even in the Rams' best years, the cavernous venue sold out very infrequently, causing blackouts of Rams games on local TV. Additionally, it was located in South Central Los Angeles, which was perceived as being one of the city's more dangerous neighborhoods, a sentiment that had begun in the 1960s and had since grown. The Coliseum also lacked adequate nearby parking. At various times they shared the stadium with both the USC Trojans and UCLA Bruins football teams. Ownership (Carroll Rosenbloom, followed by his widow Georgia Frontiere) was unable to persuade the city to build a new stadium in Los Angeles, so they decided to move out of the Coliseum to Anaheim (28 miles southeast of downtown L.A.) in Orange County, which was then experiencing an enormous boom in population and construction.

Beginning in 1980, the Rams played in Anaheim Stadium, which already had a football press box built into the upper deck when it opened in 1966. Further renovations included enclosing the facility by extending the stadium's three decks (the stadium, built mostly with baseball in mind, had previously been open to the outside), and building luxury suites in the mezzanine "club" level.

=== Los Angeles Raiders ===
The Los Angeles Memorial Coliseum next received an NFL team in 1982, when the Oakland Raiders moved to Los Angeles to become the Los Angeles Raiders. Team owner Al Davis moved there without the approval of his fellow owners or NFL commissioner Pete Rozelle. One major factor for Davis in moving to the Coliseum—despite its flaws as a football stadium—was his assumption that the NFL would eventually approve pay-per-view telecasts for its games; such a move would potentially have given the Raiders a virtual TV monopoly in Los Angeles, the nation's second-largest TV market. Davis also counted on being able to persuade the Los Angeles Coliseum Commission to renovate the facility, particularly by installing scores of luxury boxes. The UCLA Bruins moved their home to the Rose Bowl Stadium in response to the Raiders' arrival.

The Raiders continued the success they had in Oakland after the move south, winning Super Bowl XVIII in January 1984—which was the only Super Bowl-winning team under the city of Los Angeles until 2022—and reaching the AFC Championship Game in the 1990 season. Even with this on-field success, the team gained a controversial reputation off the field, as its silver and black colors became associated with L.A.'s notorious street gangs. More importantly, the Los Angeles Coliseum Commission never gave Davis the lucrative package of amenities he had been promised, and the NFL's broadcast contracts never instituted pay-per-view. Additionally, due to concerns about the area around Exposition Park and the Raiders' difficulty in selling out their home games (resulting in television blackouts in Los Angeles), the NFL scheduled all of the Raiders' appearances on Monday Night Football as road games after 1985, and would not even consider letting them play Monday night games in Anaheim. Eventually, Davis lost patience and entertained an offer from Irwindale, California (east of downtown L.A.) in 1987, but did not move there.

== 1995: Both Los Angeles franchises leave ==
=== Rams move to St. Louis ===
In the early 1990s, Rams owner Georgia Frontiere began to shop around for a new home for her team, which was falling behind other NFL teams in luxury-box and other non-shared revenue. By the end of the 1994 season, talks had begun with St. Louis and Baltimore, two cities that had lost their original NFL franchises (the Cardinals and Colts, respectively), and had both been unsuccessful in efforts to obtain an expansion franchise the previous year; meanwhile, she was hoping that Anaheim and/or Orange County would also make an attractive offer. Anaheim, going through a recession, could not agree on a tax package to pay for the improvements that Frontiere insisted on, so they dropped out of the bidding. Rams fans, bothered by Frontiere talking to other cities about moving the franchise, voiced their anger by asking for her to sell the team, booing her and starting derogatory chants at games directed at her. Attendance began dwindling, due to frustration by the fans over ownership and the performance by the team on the field. Eventually, St. Louis gave Frontiere the offer she wanted, a brand-new $280 million domed stadium called the Trans World Dome (now known as the Dome at America's Center) with a long-term lease and over 100 luxury boxes. The move was announced in February 1995 and approved by NFL owners that April. The Rams played their last game in Los Angeles on Christmas Eve in 1994, losing 24–21 to the Washington Redskins in front of only 25,750 fans in attendance at Anaheim Stadium. During the 2009 offseason, following Frontiere's death, it was announced the Rams were for sale. It was considered possible that the next owner of the Rams could move the team back to Los Angeles; but this prospect was at the time thought to have become much less likely when then-minority owner Stan Kroenke, a Missouri native and resident, acquired complete control in August 2010.

=== Raiders return to Oakland ===
In May 1995 after the announced departure of the Rams for St. Louis, the owners of the National Football League teams approved with a 27–1 vote with two abstentions, a resolution supporting a plan to build a $200 million, privately financed stadium on property owned by Hollywood Park for the Raiders. Al Davis balked and refused the deal over a stipulation that he would have had to accept a second team at the stadium. Ultimately in 2016, this became the location for SoFi Stadium.

Due in no small part to this and the decision by the Los Angeles Sports Commission to halt further planned renovations to the Coliseum due to repair costs generated by the 1994 Northridge earthquake, Al Davis gave up on Los Angeles, and decided to accept a new stadium renovation offer from Oakland, California and to return to his team's former home. The renovation expanded the Oakland Coliseum to 63,000 seats and added 86 luxury boxes and thousands of club seats. The deal was announced on June 23, 1995 and approved by league owners on August 9 of that year. The Raiders, like the Rams, played their last game in Los Angeles on Christmas Eve in 1994, losing 19–9 to the Kansas City Chiefs in front of 64,130 in attendance at the Los Angeles Memorial Coliseum.

== Two decades without a team ==
Los Angeles remained without an NFL franchise from 1995 to 2015. One key sticking point had been that a new team needed to play in the outdated Coliseum or Rose Bowl, or a lower-capacity NFL-specific stadium needed to be built in the area.

=== Attempted Seahawks move to Los Angeles ===
In March 1996, Seattle Seahawks owner Ken Behring moved office equipment and some athletic gear to the Juliette Low Elementary School in Anaheim that once held Rams practices, hoping to get approval for a permanent move to Southern California. He proposed to have the Seahawks play at the Rose Bowl while an NFL stadium was built in Anaheim or Los Angeles. But the proposal was announced after the Cleveland Browns had announced their move to Baltimore, and the Houston Oilers were planning to move to Nashville. Amid an image of instability, the league had passed a resolution that a return to Los Angeles would be controlled by the league (i.e., the 30 team owners collectively). The owners vetoed the move and fined the Seahawks $500,000 for every day the team was in Anaheim, Behring halted the process and moved the equipment back to Seattle.

Eventually, Puget Sound resident Paul Allen bought the team, and kept it in Seattle. Public funds were used to build Seahawks Stadium, now known as Lumen Field, which opened in 2002.

=== Expansion team bid ===
Perhaps the closest Los Angeles came to regaining the NFL during this period was in 1999, when the NFL approved a new franchise, the league's 32nd, for Los Angeles, in March on the condition that the city and NFL agree on a stadium site and stadium financing by September 15, 1999. Those agreements were never reached, and on October 6, 1999, the franchise was awarded to a Houston ownership group instead, which formed the Houston Texans, who would begin play in 2002.

=== From 2000 onward ===
2006 Model of a proposed renovation to the Coliseum.

Then-Governor Arnold Schwarzenegger championed a new football stadium in Anaheim in tandem with a new L.A. Coliseum in 2006. There were reports, however, that NFL owners would not approve a return to the L.A. area until two teams committed to play in a single new stadium (similar to the New York Giants and New York Jets, first in Giants Stadium and since 2010 in MetLife Stadium). In response to rising cost estimates for a new stadium, NFL commissioner Roger Goodell said that returning the NFL to Los Angeles would require the league to consider unspecified "alternative solutions." In November 2007, the then-Los Angeles Mayor Antonio Villaraigosa declared that the policy of requiring the NFL to move to the Coliseum would change and other options would be explored.

During the absence of teams in this era the NFL still maintained a presence in the Los Angeles market through NFL Network, the league's in-house cable and satellite network which was founded in 2003, and was originally headquartered in nearby Culver City before moving to Inglewood upon the NFL returning and building a campus there. The very first episode of NFL Total Access had Rich Eisen say "welcome to the NFL in Los Angeles". The Coliseum was part of the 2005 opening weekend celebration, and was home of the NFL Players Association's "Rookie Premiere", in which first-year athletes pose for trading card pictures; The Dallas Cowboys also hosted their training camp in the Los Angeles suburb of Oxnard on a rotating basis during this period.

=== Los Angeles as a bargaining chip ===
During the two decades, many NFL teams used Los Angeles as a bargaining chip to get their cities to build new stadiums in their existing cities. Owners expressed interest in moving and visited Los Angeles to encourage their city councils. By 2015 more than half the league had threatened to move there, during negotiations for new or renovated stadiums, which cost hundreds of millions of dollars, and 27 NFL stadiums had been built or received at least $400 million in renovations. According to NBC News,

The threat of moving a team to Los Angeles is more valuable for the NFL than actually placing a team there. It's the perfect bargaining chip for the league: Why would a franchise stay in, say, cold-weather, small-market Minnesota without a new stadium when big-market, celebrity-studded L.A. beckons?

Sports economist John Vrooman of Vanderbilt University stated:

It is entirely possible that the L.A. football market has been more valuable to the N.F.L. empty than if it had been occupied since 1995 ... It is standard operating procedure for the N.F.L. commissioner and other concerned owners to drop the not-so-veiled threat of relocation to L.A.

and a Yahoo! Sports contributor observed that:

The NFL doesn't necessarily use Los Angeles as a bargaining chip with other cities, but whenever there is a stadium issue in another city, that team suddenly ends up on a list of franchises that could relocate to sunny Southern California. Convenient.

Furthermore, some said efforts to move were a "way of playing with fanbases' feelings". In July 2015, HBO's Last Week Tonight with John Oliver had a segment on stadiums that looked at one of San Diego Chargers' fans attempts to collect public money to build a new stadium.

In December 2015, Drew Magary wrote:

They’ve pit... [an NFL team] against one another (sometimes encouraging them to forge alliances and gang up on each other) in an effort to secure the optimal L.A. deal, plus taxpayer-funded stadiums for whoever stays behind. They’ve unveiled stadium designs... It's been a slow, open, agonizing process, with the NFL dripping out rumors and veiled demands and "leaders in the clubhouse" to their lapdog beat reporters every Sunday morning like clockwork to help speed the process along, with no interest in the emotional impact of these potential relocations... None of this is new or surprising, of course... Pro sports teams have been more interested in exploiting fan loyalty than appreciating it.

Supporters of a Los Angeles NFL team agreed that their city had been, as Los Angeles City Councilman Bernard Parks said, "used as a pawn". He added, "L.A. always comes into the equation whenever a city is looking for a new stadium. Lo and behold, shockingly, the stadium gets built and L.A. is not in the equation." Fred Rosen said, "It's like the rabbit at the dog track. L.A.'s always chasing the rabbit, and the NFL has also used L.A. as the rabbit." The lack of an NFL-quality stadium also made moving a team to Los Angeles risky because of the possibility of being forced to play in the obsolete Coliseum or Rose Bowl, but building a stadium without a team would be financially and politically very difficult.

In 2021, after the Rams and the Chargers moved to Los Angeles, Conor Orr of Sports Illustrated noted that the loss of the Los Angeles metropolitan area as an open market had forced NFL teams to increasingly use other, less appealing metropolitan areas in their attempts to secure taxpayer funding for stadiums. (The Bills, for example, reportedly tried to get a new stadium built in the Buffalo area by threatening a move to Austin, Texas, which has no other teams in the Big Four major professional sports leagues). Orr argued that such ultimatums have reduced the teams' leverage, as both local governments and the general public become more aware of the benefits and drawbacks of such expensive projects, and the negative effects that such moves, if realized, would have on the public relations of both the individual teams and the NFL as a whole.

=== Civic disinterest ===
Everybody I know who moves out here, I go, Would you ever move back to Boston? and they go, "Never." Philly? "Never." Chicago? "Never." But who do you root for? "Boston ... Philadelphia.. Chicago."

— Kenneth Choi, 2015

The NFL remained popular on television in Los Angeles even in the absence of local teams; 18 of the 20 most-popular programs from September 2014 to early November were NFL games. Residents could usually watch the most appealing games each week; sports bars show many games at once, and patrons and employees wear varying apparel. It was thought that a Los Angeles team might lower TV ratings.

Residents choose teams around the country to support; David Carter, sports business professor at USC, compared area fans to "the NFL's version of the United Nations". Many are from elsewhere in the United States and tend to support teams from their previous cities. As of February 2015, 10% of Los Angeles County residents who followed NFL Tweets followed the 49ers, 9% the Raiders, and 7% the Dallas Cowboys. In Orange County, the Chargers and Green Bay Packers were in second and third place. By contrast, in San Diego County 47% of NFL Twitter users followed the Chargers and no other team had more than 4.5%, despite the area having many loyal NFL fans of other teams (notably the Pittsburgh Steelers) due to the numerous military bases in the area.

Whether fans of other teams would support a new or moved NFL team in Los Angeles was unclear. The area already has very popular USC Trojans and UCLA Bruins football games, with much greater attendance than the Raiders had during the team's time in Los Angeles. John C. Phillips of the University of the Pacific stated that "People in Los Angeles really do not have that sense of community and identity with sports teams. In Cleveland and Buffalo, people identify with the city; in Los Angeles, they don't". During the Cleveland Browns' move to Baltimore in 1996 owner Art Modell received death threats. NBC News wrote that by contrast, "when the Raiders and Rams departed in 1994, Angelenos yawned before going surfing."

In 2001, a proposal was floated for a new stadium near Staples Center. The stadium and team would have been owned by billionaire Phillip Anschutz and Hollywood scion Casey Wasserman, and the stadium would have been built with private funding. That died down quickly when it failed to get the support of the city council. In particular, Mark Ridley-Thomas, whose district includes the Coliseum, never supported it.

In 2005, then-Dodgers owner Frank McCourt showed interest in a plan in which a new NFL stadium would be built next to Dodger Stadium. However, city officials expressed their displeasure with his idea in part to their favoritism of the repeatedly defunct Coliseum plan. McCourt stated that his idea was suitable if the most recent Coliseum plan were to fail. In addition, the NFL was also rumored to favor the Dodger Stadium proposal to the countless Coliseum ideas in the past.

Even after the return of the Chargers and Rams, Los Angeles area residents who are fans of other NFL teams often pack their home venues. Many of them became fans of other teams during the NFL's absence. The Rams have tried to keep out 49er fans by restricting purchases to Greater Los Angeles Area residents, which has been less than successful. Crowd noise from 49er fans have resulted in the use of a silent count by the Rams, as if they were playing an away game. The same has occurred with the Chargers against the Raiders. Despite the initial struggles for both the Rams and Chargers, both teams have since managed to gain a presence in the Los Angeles sports scene by the first decade back, with the Rams in particular having a much stronger presence due to their long legacy in the area as well as their playoff success and victory in Super Bowl LVI while the Chargers have resorted to leveraging their social media presence and youth outreach.

=== Interested parties ===
- On December 1, 2009, in an interview for KTTV (Fox 11), John Semcken of Majestic Realty Co. (developer for the Los Angeles Stadium in City of Industry) stated that there was a 50/50 chance of a team returning for the 2010 season and a 100% chance for the 2011 season. The teams explicitly mentioned in the interview were the Jacksonville Jaguars, San Diego Chargers, Tampa Bay Buccaneers, Buffalo Bills, and St. Louis (formerly Los Angeles) Rams. The interview occurred shortly after the California State Legislature and the governor approved plans for the stadium, but several months before Stan Kroenke became sole owner of the Rams.
- In mid-season of 2011, news regarding several teams involved in potential expansion broke. It was reported that Malcolm Glazer, then the owner of the Tampa Bay Buccaneers, a franchise located in a metropolitan area with some of the lowest attendance figures in multiple pro sports, including football, had talked with officials in L.A. Nothing was made official, and Glazer also had ties to England (before his death in 2014, he also owned Manchester United, and his sons inherited his interests in both clubs), where there was a small but growing conversation about potential NFL moves. Meanwhile, Jacksonville Jaguars owner Wayne Weaver sold the team to Shahid Khan; Khan had unsuccessfully attempted to buy the Rams. Khan gave a verbal, but non-binding, commitment to keep the team in Jacksonville.
- In March 2012, Yahoo! Sports reported on a meeting between the league management and Anschutz Entertainment Group (AEG), in which it became clear that none of the NFL's owners were willing to agree to the AEG's demands to move a team to Los Angeles. Neither AEG nor the league confirmed the meeting, which, if true, would jeopardize the project unless AEG were to make concessions. At the same time, the new owners of the Los Angeles Dodgers expressed interest in bringing the NFL to Chavez Ravine, current location of Dodger Stadium.
- On April 18, 2012, after a Minnesota Legislature committee rejected a public financing proposal for proposed new Minnesota Vikings stadium, the league met with Vikings owner Zygi Wilf and Minnesota governor Mark Dayton to discuss the potential sale and move of the Vikings franchise. Soon after, Wilf met with Los Angeles mayor Antonio Villaraigosa regarding the same topic, and indicated he would not renew the Vikings' lease on the Metrodome without a plan for a new stadium. After a re-vote, the Minnesota House of Representatives passed a stadium financing bill on May 8, albeit with less money than the Vikings were seeking. The Senate passed the bill May 10, at which point the Vikings indicated they would be willing to accept the terms. This effectively eliminated the Vikings from the threat of moving.
- In August 2014, it became known that multibillionaire Eli Broad was one of at least two Los Angeles-based parties to consider placing a bid on the Buffalo Bills with the intent of moving the team to Los Angeles. Broad declined to place a bid, determining that the league would never approve of moving the Bills and such a move would bring too much scrutiny from politicians. The team was later sold to Buffalo Sabres owner and billionaire Terry Pegula, who planned to keep the team in Buffalo long-term. Pegula's wife, 17 years younger, also owns a significant portion of the team and has lived in Western New York since childhood, likely keeping the team put for several decades.

=== Potential league expansion ===
In 2012, NFL Commissioner Roger Goodell appeared on Costas Live on NBC Sports Network to discuss a possibility of football in Los Angeles. Goodell said that he wouldn't like any team to move to the city. The commissioner said that if Los Angeles were to get a team, the league would have to expand to 34 teams. With no other non-NFL markets in the United States anywhere close to Los Angeles in size (the second-largest media market without an NFL team is Orlando, Florida, ranked #18, and even that market is within 75 miles of the Tampa Bay Buccaneers), adding two expansion teams simultaneously in Los Angeles was one solution that had been explored. The perceived benefits of such a solution included the possibility of two owners being able to share the costs for a new stadium (similar to what was done for New York's two teams). In addition, adding two teams to Los Angeles at the same time would have precluded the possibility of one team having to pay any sort of territorial indemnity to the other.

== 2016: The NFL returns ==
=== Three franchises apply to move ===
On January 31, 2014, the Los Angeles Times and the St. Louis Post-Dispatch reported that Rams owner Stan Kroenke had purchased about 60 acres of land next to the Forum in Inglewood, California. Kroenke subsequently announced plans to build an NFL stadium on the site, in connection with the owners of the adjacent 238-acre Hollywood Park site, Stockbridge Capital Group.

On January 5, 2015, the Los Angeles Times reported that Stan Kroenke and Stockbridge Capital Group were jointly developing a new NFL stadium on the Inglewood property owned by Kroenke. Later that month on January 30, 2015, NFL Commissioner Roger Goodell held a press conference two days before the Super Bowl. In his press conference, Goodell said that multiple teams had expressed an interest in moving to Los Angeles, but that the league had made "no determination" about any particular team moving to Los Angeles in the future.

On February 24, 2015, Inglewood City Council approved plans for the stadium with construction planned to begin in December 2015, with or without a commitment from the Rams, and avoiding a public vote on June 2 in the process. On December 21, 2015, construction was officially underway at the Hollywood Park site.

Almost one year later, on January 4, 2016, the three NFL franchises who previously played in the Greater Los Angeles Area applied to move to the area amid stadium issues and proposals of building new arenas in Southern California. They were the St. Louis Rams (who played in Los Angeles and Anaheim from 1946 to 1994), the Oakland Raiders (played in Los Angeles from 1982 to 1994), and the San Diego Chargers (had its inaugural AFL season in L.A.). The Rams planned to build on the 60-acre (24 ha) tract in Inglewood between The Forum and Hollywood Park that Kroenke had already began work on, and the Raiders and Chargers announced plans for a privately financed $1.7 billion stadium that the two teams would build in Carson, California, if they were to move to the Los Angeles market. Both teams said they would continue to attempt to get stadiums built in their respective cities.

All three teams had year-to-year stadium leases with escape clauses. The Rams' were triggered because The Dome at America's Center, then known as Edward Jones Dome, had to be among the NFL's eight best by the end of the 2014 season. Under the terms of the agreement, the St. Louis CVC was required to improve the Edward Jones Dome in 2005. However, then-owner Georgia Frontiere waived the provision in exchange for cash that served as a penalty for the city's non-compliance. The minor renovations, which cost about $70 million, did not bring the stadium within the specifications required under the lease agreement; thus, keeping the Dome in a state of uncertainty. In 2012, the St. Louis Convention and Visitors Commission proposed a $124 million upgrade; the Rams countered with a $700 million proposal. An arbitrator ruled in favor of the Rams in February 2013, and the commission soon announced that it would not pursue any upgrade, leading to speculation about owner Stan Kroenke's plans for the team. Publicly, city, county and state officials had expressed no interest in providing further funding to the Edward Jones Dome in light of those entities, as well as taxpayers, continuing to owe about $300 million more on that facility. As such, if a resolution was not reached by the end of the 2014 NFL season and the City of St. Louis remained non-compliant in its obligations under the lease agreement, the Rams would be free to nullify their lease and go to a year-to-year lease. Months later, the Rams scheduled to play in London, which violated the Edward Jones Dome's terms of lease.

Once Carol and Mark Davis inherited the Raiders in 2012, they acknowledged negotiations with the L.A. groups, but were dissatisfied with both of the proposals; the city still remained an option along with San Antonio, Texas. Chargers owner Dean Spanos said in 2014 that adding a Los Angeles team "would really be harmful to us", given that "25 to 30% of our business comes from the L.A./Orange County areas". However, despite problems with Qualcomm Stadium, Spanos refused to exercise the escape clause ever since the opportunity was offered in 2007.

In March 2015, Goodell said that, despite the stadium proposals, the league was "not focused" on bringing NFL back to Los Angeles for the 2016 NFL season, and any Los Angeles team in 2016 would "have to play in a temporary facility." He added one month later that only one of the two proposals would be greenlighted by the league.

By June 2015, the NFL had sent requests regarding the possibility of temporarily hosting football games to five venues: the Los Angeles Memorial Coliseum and Dodger Stadium in Los Angeles; Rose Bowl in Pasadena; Angel Stadium in Anaheim; and StubHub Center in Carson. Refusals were issued by both Angel Stadium, for conflicts with the Major League Baseball season, and the Rose Bowl, expressing more interest in a music festival. On October 23, 2015, Mark Fabiani, spokesperson for the Chargers, confirmed that the team planned to officially notify the NFL about its intentions to move to Los Angeles in January during the timetable when teams can request to move. All three teams filed the required paperwork to move on January 4.

=== The Rams return ===
Weeks later, the NFL owners gathered in Houston for a meeting on January 12 and January 13, a meeting that decided the end of the Los Angeles race. A few days before the scheduled owners meeting, Dallas Cowboys owner Jerry Jones suggested that the St. Louis Rams and San Diego Chargers should share Stan Kroenke's SoFi Stadium. This suggestion was taken as a possible option discussed in the Houston meetings. During the Los Angeles meeting, the Committee on Los Angeles Opportunities, which consists of six NFL owners, favored the Carson project over the Rams' Inglewood project. However, in the first round of voting during the meeting, the Rams and the Inglewood proposal got the greater number of votes than the Carson project with the former receiving 21 votes and the latter receiving 11 votes. As the Rams and the Inglewood proposal did not meet the required 24 votes a second round of voting was undertaken. In the second round of voting, the Rams' Inglewood project received 20 votes with the Chargers and Raiders Carson proposal only having 12. Eventually, the Inglewood proposal received 30 votes and the Carson proposal receiving only two; meaning that, after 21 consecutive seasons without an NFL franchise, Los Angeles finally had an NFL team.

After hours of finding a compromise, the Rams moved to Los Angeles, with the Chargers having the option to join them (had the Chargers declined to exercise that option, the Raiders would have also had this option). The league had set a moving fee of $550 million for any team approved to move. The Rams played seven home games per season at the Los Angeles Memorial Coliseum from 2016 until 2019 (as part of the deal, the Rams agreed to host one game in London per year as part of the NFL International Series) and then moved to their new stadium, SoFi Stadium in Inglewood for the 2020 season.

=== The Chargers return ===
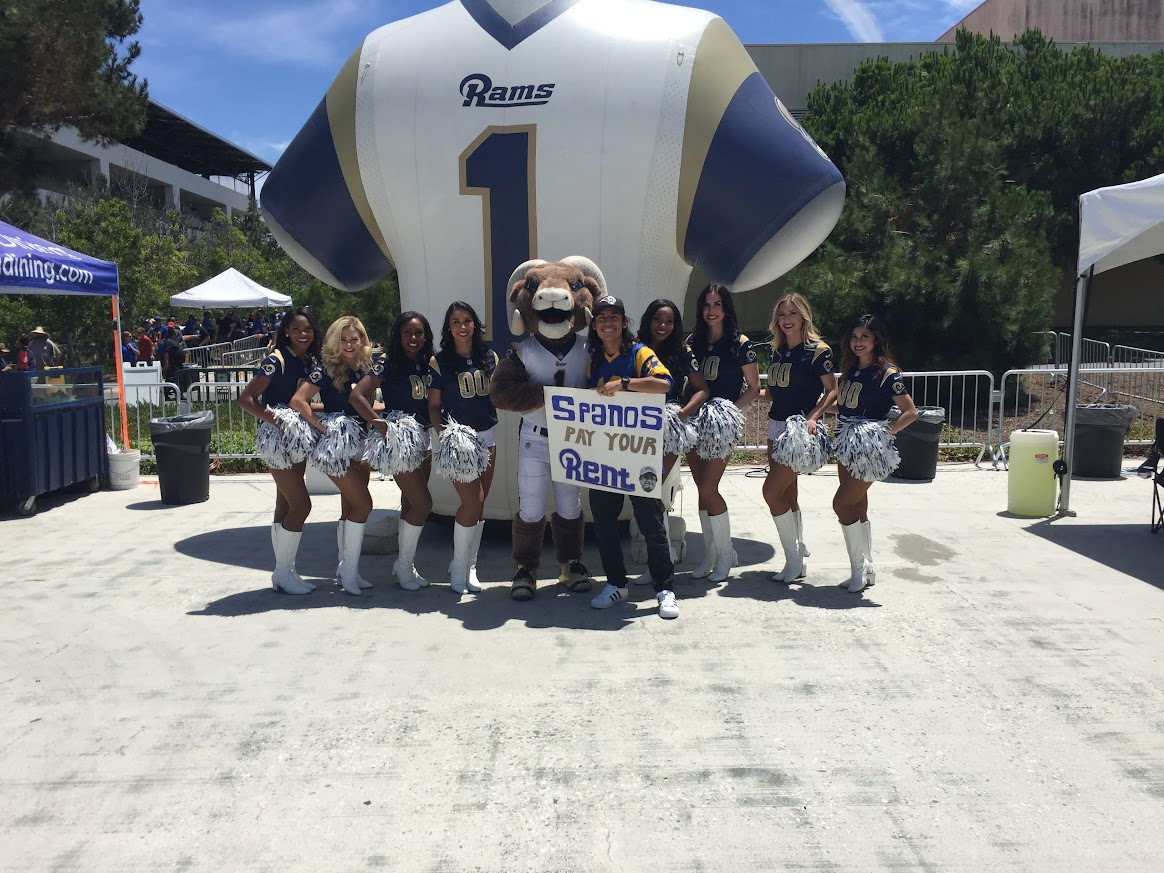
Rams' mascot Rampage and several cheerleaders pose with a fan with a sign taunting the Chargers during a joint practice between both teams in August 2019 referencing the Chargers becoming a tenant at then-under construction SoFi Stadium.

After the conclusion of the 2016 season, the Chargers officially announced they too would exercise the option they had to move and would return to Los Angeles; the Chargers moved to the StubHub Center (now known as Dignity Health Sports Park) beginning in 2017 and played there until 2019. They then moved to SoFi Stadium for 2020 and are co-tenants with the Rams.

== NFL results between Los Angeles teams ==
=== Raiders vs. Rams ===
Season	Date	Away team	Score	Home team	Venue
1982	December 18	Los Angeles Rams	31–37	Los Angeles Raiders	Los Angeles Memorial Coliseum
1985	December 23	Los Angeles Raiders	16–6	Los Angeles Rams	Anaheim Stadium
1988	September 18	Los Angeles Rams	22–17	Los Angeles Raiders	Los Angeles Memorial Coliseum
1991	October 20	Los Angeles Rams	17–20	Los Angeles Raiders	Los Angeles Memorial Coliseum
1994	November 13	Los Angeles Raiders	20–17	Los Angeles Rams	Anaheim Stadium

=== Chargers vs. Rams ===
Season	Date	Away team	Score	Home team	Venue
2018	September 23	Los Angeles Chargers	23–35	Los Angeles Rams	Los Angeles Memorial Coliseum
2022	January 1	Los Angeles Rams	10–31	Los Angeles Chargers	SoFi Stadium
2026	November 1	Los Angeles Chargers	9–24	Los Angeles Rams	SoFi Stadium

== Football stadiums in the Los Angeles area ==
=== SoFi Stadium ===
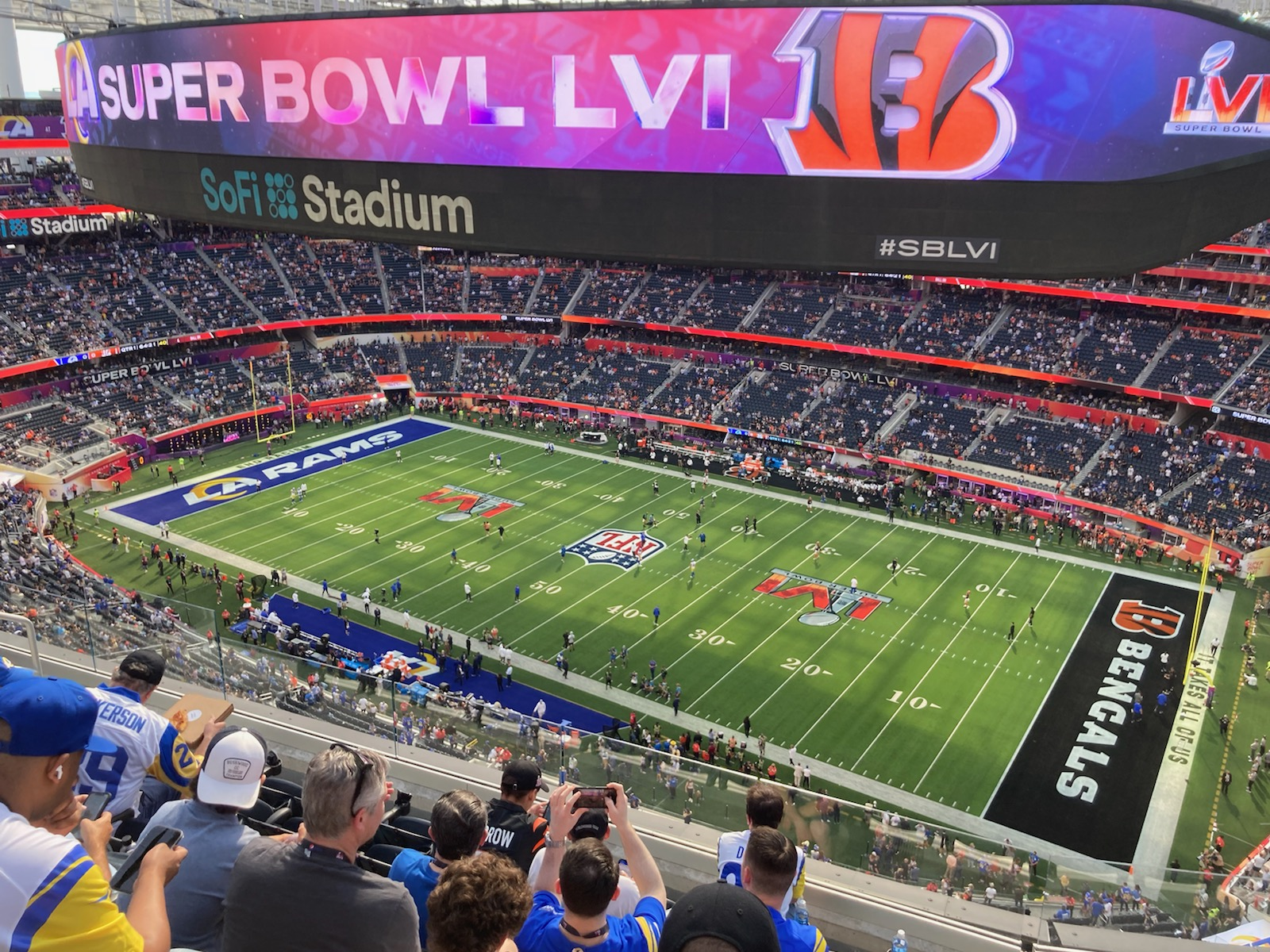
Super Bowl LVI – SoFi Stadium

SoFi Stadium is located in Inglewood, California on the site of the former Hollywood Park Racetrack. It is the home of the Los Angeles Rams, the Los Angeles Chargers, and the LA Bowl. It also hosted Super Bowl LVI in February 2022, as well as the College Football Playoff National Championship in January 2023. The sole NFL venue in the Los Angeles area, construction began in 2016 and was completed in 2020. The stadium can seat 70,240 spectators for most events, and 30,000 more for larger events, for a total of 100,240. In addition to the main stadium there is a connected performance venue called the YouTube Theater with a capacity of 6,000 seats that opened in 2021.

The venue is part of a larger Hollywood Park development on the former racetrack property that aside from the stadium includes the Hollywood Park Casino, the headquarters of NFL Media which includes the NFL Network, NFL RedZone, NFL.com and the NFL app, and a master-planned neighborhood with over 8.5 million square feet (790,000 m^{2}) for office space and condominiums, a 12-screen Cinepolis movie theater, ballrooms, outdoor spaces for community programming, retail, a fitness center, a lake with a waterfall fountain, a luxury hotel, a brewery, high-scale restaurants and an open-air shopping and entertainment complex.

=== Los Angeles Memorial Coliseum ===
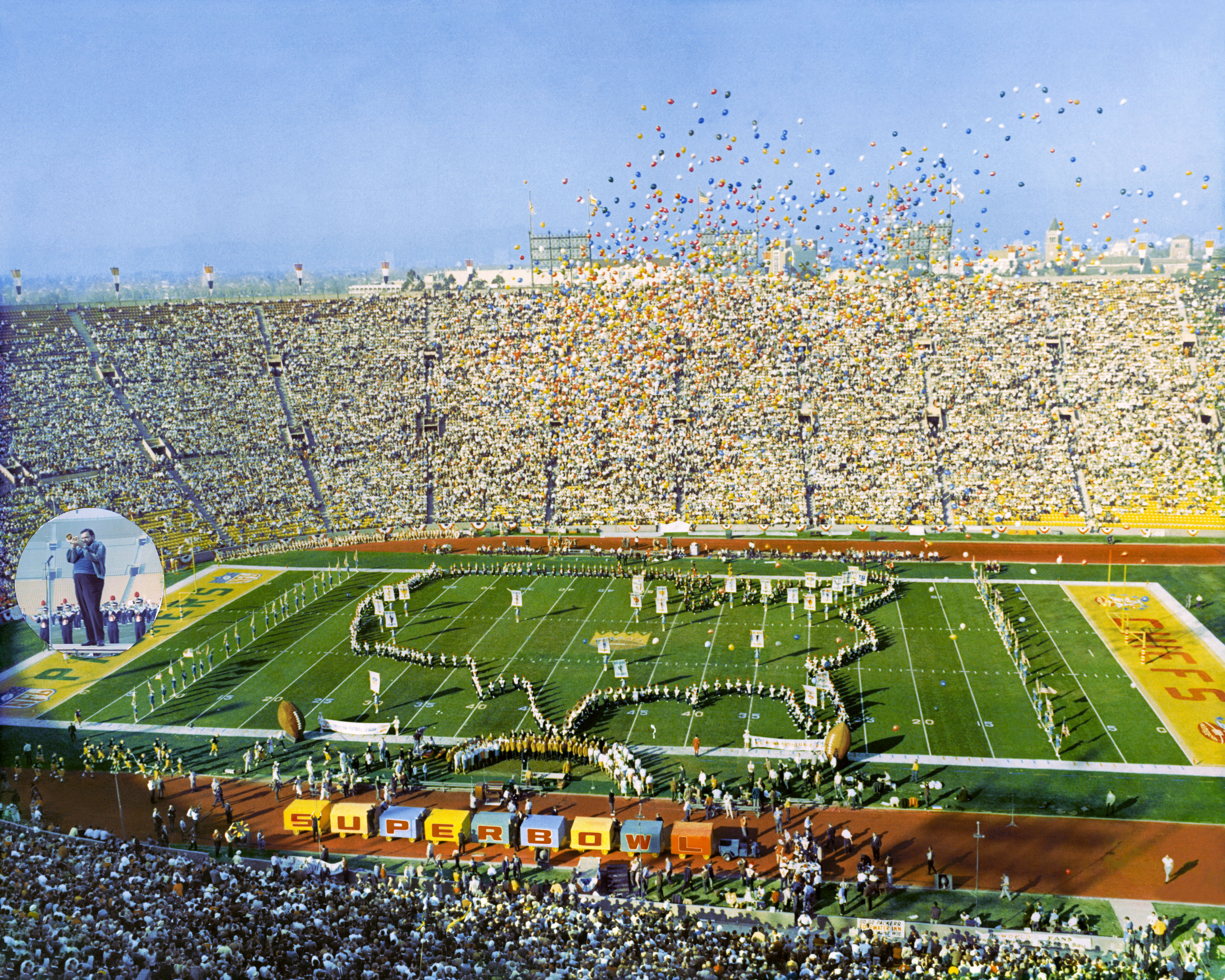
Super Bowl I – Los Angeles Coliseum

The Los Angeles Memorial Coliseum was built in 1923, and is both the largest stadium in California and the ninth largest in the United States. It has been home of the NCAA's USC Trojans since its inauguration, and also hosted the UCLA Bruins from 1928 to 1981. All NFL franchises from Southern California have used the Coliseum: the Rams held home games from their arrival in 1946 to their move to Anaheim, California in 1980 and returned in 2016 playing there through the 2019 season using the stadium as an interim home while their permanent home of SoFi Stadium was under construction; the Raiders were headquartered there during their Los Angeles years, from 1982 to 1994; and the Chargers played the 1960 AFL season at the Coliseum, moving to San Diego the following year. The Coliseum also hosted the 1967 AFL-NFL Championship Game, retroactively known as Super Bowl I.

The Coliseum was problematic as an NFL venue. At various times in its history, it was either the largest or one of the largest stadiums in the NFL, making it difficult to sell out.

Before 1993, the Coliseum Commission approved changes to improve the stadium as a football facility. Capacity was reduced to around 68,000, the field was lowered, the surrounding running track was removed, bleachers were replaced by single seats, and locker rooms and fan restrooms were upgraded. Proposals were raised for Coliseum renovations, where the refurbished stadium would have seated 63,300 for most major events, expanding to about 80,000 for Super Bowls and University of Southern California (USC) home games. The Coliseum would have retained the peristyle section and columns that are part of the current stadium, in a design similar to Soldier Field in Chicago, which is the home of the NFL's Chicago Bears. This stadium was supported by then-California governor Arnold Schwarzenegger and the Los Angeles City Council approved a preliminary financing plan and environmental impact report in 2006. But the Exposition Park area still carries safety concerns among some fans.

In October 2006, a new doubt was cast over the Coliseum's future as a possible venue, as reports surfaced that the Coliseum Commission was negotiating to hand over control of the stadium to USC, which could preclude any plans to renovate the stadium for the NFL. Pat Lynch, the Coliseum's general manager, claimed in a panel discussion in December 2006 that the true cost of a new Coliseum would be closer to $650 million.

=== Anaheim Stadium ===
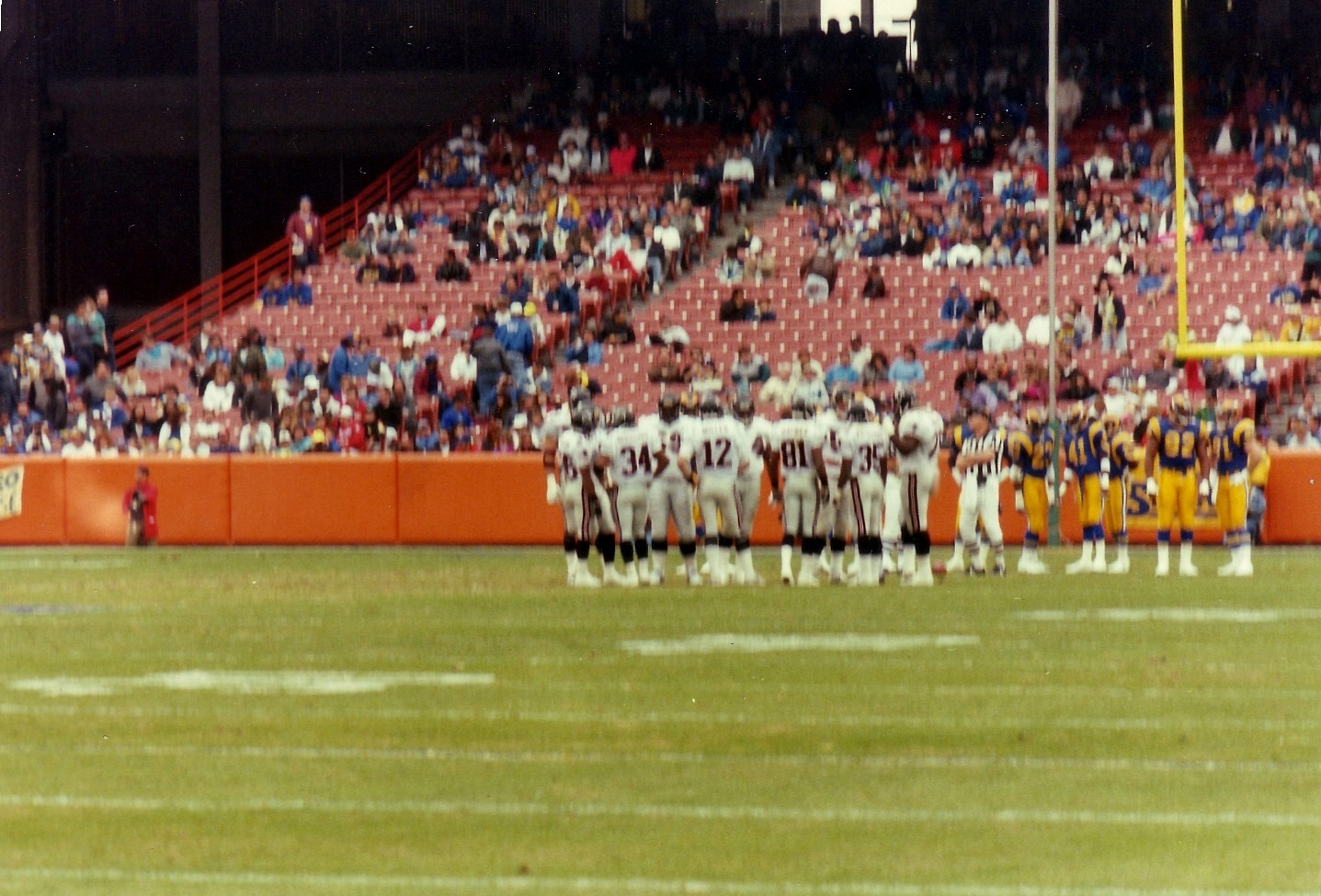
Rams game at Anaheim Stadium, 1991.

Anaheim Stadium, known since 2004 as Angel Stadium of Anaheim, is in the city of Anaheim, about 25 miles (40 km) southeast of Downtown Los Angeles. It was built by Major League Baseball's California Angels – currently, the Los Angeles Angels – and opened in 1966. The stadium was renovated in 1980, adding an enclosed upper deck to accommodate the Rams, who were looking for a more modern venue than the aging LA Coliseum. Because games were blacked out on local TV, Rams' then-owner Carroll Rosenbloom also wanted a venue that could accommodate a sizeable crowd. About 23,000 seats were added for football games. Three teams had played home games in Anaheim Stadium before the Rams: the Southern California Sun of the World Football League and the now-defunct football programs at Cal State Fullerton and Long Beach State.

After the Rams left California in 1995, Angel Stadium was renovated and reverted to a baseball-only configuration in 1997. The stadium now hosts occasional high school football games but can no longer meet the needs of national TV football broadcasts.

=== Rose Bowl ===
The Rose Bowl in Pasadena, ten miles (16 kilometers) northeast of downtown Los Angeles, was built in 1922. It is used by the NCAA's UCLA Bruins football team since 1982, but has never been a permanent home for an NFL team. The Rose Bowl instead has hosted the Super Bowl as it was considered more suitable than the Los Angeles Memorial Coliseum for this high-profile event, and with five editions (XI, XIV, XVII, XXI, and XXVII) has the third most games of any venue. During the two decades without the NFL in Los Angeles, a renovated Rose Bowl was a strong candidate to host a relocated or expansion team. However, after many years of varying offers, no deal could be struck between the NFL owners, the stadium's owner, and the City of Pasadena. On November 7, 2006, Pasadena voters overwhelmingly (72% opposition) rejected a financing package that would have allocated money for a renovation of the stadium that would have accommodated an NFL team in fear of greatly increased traffic. While in 2012, Pasadena officials approved a proposal which could allow an NFL team to temporarily play in the Rose Bowl, once the NFL asked in 2015 whether the Rose Bowl was open to being a temporary home for an NFL team, the stadium operators declined the offer.

=== Dignity Health Sports Park ===
Dignity Health Sports Park is located on the campus of California State University, Dominguez Hills in Carson, California, approximately 13 miles (21 km) south of Downtown Los Angeles. While a soccer-specific stadium, it receives high school, college gridiron, and minor pro football hosting California Interscholastic Federation finals and the NFLPA Collegiate Bowl. While the Chargers and Raiders planned a football stadium in Carson, they visited Dignity Health Sports Park (then known as the StubHub Center) regarding using the facilities for training. The Chargers ultimately agreed to use the stadium as their temporary home stadium until SoFi Stadium was complete.

=== Past proposals ===
==== Dodger Stadium site ====
The Dodger Stadium parking lot was previously discussed by NFL owners, in private, as possibly being the best site in Southern California to build a new professional football stadium. Officials with the Dodgers and the NFL met in secret twice in 2005 to discuss the possibility of constructing a stadium and retail complex adjacent to Dodger Stadium. The 49ers' current home, Levi's Stadium, was built in the parking lot of an amusement park. After the Boston Herald reported the details of the plan, political pressure forced both the NFL and Dodgers owner Frank McCourt to deny that either party was aggressively pursuing the idea.

==== Carson ====
On February 19, 2015, the Chargers and Raiders announced plans for a privately financed $1.7 billion stadium that the two teams would build in Carson, California if they were to move to the Los Angeles market. Both teams stated that they would continue to attempt to get stadiums built in their respective cities.

Due to television contracts, NFL bylaws, and both teams being in the same division, had both of the longstanding division rivals were to have moved to LA, one of the teams would have had to move to the National Football Conference and the NFC West, something that Mark Davis volunteered the Raiders to be willing to do. Davis's father and Raiders founder Al Davis was a staunch opponent of the NFL before the merger. Had such a realignment occurred, one of the existing NFC West teams would have taken their spot in the AFC West, with either the Arizona Cardinals, St. Louis Rams, or Seattle Seahawks being the most likely candidates (the latter had been previously part of the AFC West until the 2002 realignment).

On April 22, 2015, the Carson City Council bypassed the option to put the stadium to public vote and approved the plan 3–0. On May 5, 2015, Carson City Council unanimously voted to issue $50 million to finish environmental cleanup on the site. On May 19, 2015, the Chargers and Raiders announced that they finalized a land deal to secure land in Carson which was transferred to the joint powers authority in Carson after the 157-acre site was purchased by Carson Holdings a company set up by the two teams. In May 2015, Carmen Policy was hired to spearhead the project.

On November 11, 2015, Bob Iger (Disney CEO) was hired as non-executive chairman of Carson Holdings. in addition, Iger had an option to buy a stake in the Chargers or Raiders had the Carson proposal been approved. On January 12, 2016, the Inglewood proposal and the Rams return to Los Angeles was approved 30-2 thus effectively rejecting and killing the Carson proposal. The Carson proposal was later repurposed by the Raiders for Allegiant Stadium in Paradise, Nevada when the team moved to the Las Vegas metropolitan area in 2020.

==== City of Industry ====
Edward P. Roski, a part-owner of the Los Angeles Lakers and Los Angeles Kings, announced plans for a new stadium on the northern side of the interchange of State Routes 57 and 60 (almost 22 miles (35 km) east of downtown LA) with the purpose of attracting a team to the Los Angeles region. Roski, who built the Staples Center, stated that the new 75,000-seat stadium, a part of a 600-acre entertainment and retail project, would all be privately financed and be the centerpiece of a new entertainment complex in the City of Industry. In June 2008, reports surfaced that the City of Industry could become the home of the 49ers or Raiders by as early as 2010 when both teams' stadium leases expired, or could become home to another team. The project was cleared to begin construction, though it kept waiting on the negotiations of the NFL's commitment to move a team (or possibility two) to Los Angeles.

==== Downtown Los Angeles ====
Casey Wasserman and Tim Leiweke investigated the probability of building a 72,000-seat stadium behind Staples Center, where the West Hall of the Los Angeles Convention Center now sits. In December 2010, Leiweke set a deadline anticipating a cleared negotiation with Los Angeles over control of the current convention center and ownership of the land and an agreement with the NFL over the likelihood of a team moving to Los Angeles. AEG owner Philip Anschutz discussed a potential move with three teams: former Los Angeles teams: San Diego Chargers, St. Louis Rams, and Oakland Raiders. The Buffalo Bills, Jacksonville Jaguars, Minnesota Vikings, and San Francisco 49ers were also considered as candidates for a move. On August 9, 2011, the LA City Council approved plans to build Farmers Field in a 12–0 vote, with a plan to open a stadium as early as 2016. On March 9, 2015, AEG announced it would not seek an extension to the deadline for an agreement with a team set for April 17 that year, effectively shutting down the proposal.

== Non-NFL gridiron football activity ==
- The Southern California Sun of the World Football League played two seasons in Anaheim from 1974 to 1975, playing their games at Anaheim Stadium.
- The Coliseum briefly fielded another professional football team, the Los Angeles Express of the United States Football League (USFL), from 1983 to 1985. The league played in the springtime, avoiding conflicts with the NFL and the Raiders for the use of the Los Angeles Memorial Coliseum. Because of dwindling financial fortunes, the team played its final game at John Shepard Stadium on the campus of Los Angeles Pierce College.
- The Arena Football League has featured four teams representing the Los Angeles metropolitan area since its launch:
  - The Los Angeles Cobras played only one season in 1988, playing their games at the Los Angeles Sports Arena.
  - The Anaheim Piranhas played in the nearby Orange County suburb of Anaheim from 1996 to 1997, playing its games at the Arrowhead Pond of Anaheim; it folded after owner C. David Baker was promoted to league commissioner.
  - The Los Angeles Avengers played at the Staples Center from 2000 to 2008, before the league suspended operations. The league would be revived in 2010, but (initially) without a Los Angeles-area team.
  - The LA KISS, a team owned by and branded after the band of the same name, played from 2014 to 2016. While nominally representing the city, the team played in Anaheim (much like the Rams from 1980 to 1994) at the Honda Center.
- The Spring Football League, a league that lasted only two weeks in 2000, included as one of its four teams the Los Angeles Dragons.
- The Los Angeles Xtreme won the only championship in the brief history of the original XFL, in 2001, playing its games at the Los Angeles Memorial Coliseum.
- The United Football League had committed to a Los Angeles franchise (possibly with Mark Cuban as its owner) for its 2009 season and, when the league cut back the number of teams it planned to launch from six to four, had planned to have the team that became the Las Vegas Locomotives play one of its home games in the Home Depot Center (now Dignity Health Sports Park) in preparation for a full-time Los Angeles team in 2010. However, the league later dropped their plan to play at the Center in 2009 and, by the time the league failed in October 2012, had never established a team in the city as promised.
- The Los Angeles Temptation of the league now known as the Extreme Football League (originally the Lingerie Football League, and later the Legends Football League) played its first two full seasons (2009 and 2010) in the city (specifically the LA Memorial Coliseum) before moving to the Inland Empire in 2011. The Temptation still referred to themselves as a Los Angeles team until their folding in 2013.
- Los Angeles was one of the eight markets that hosted teams in the second XFL, being home to the LA Wildcats who played at Dignity Health Sports Park, occupying the facilities built at the stadium for the Chargers' temporary stay.

== In fiction ==
During the period when Los Angeles did not have a team, many movies and TV shows either featured fictional professional teams based in Los Angeles (possibly as a way of avoiding NFL trademarks) or featured storylines involving the city receiving an expansion franchise. Some examples of this are listed below:

- In the season 7 Entourage episode "Buzzed", the fictional Hollywood agent Ari Gold is offered to run an NFL franchise in Los Angeles after he impresses the NFL board, but fails to win the contract to sell the NFL media rights. Ari jokingly states he will name the team the "LA Gold".
- In season 3 of Psych, an episode revolves around a death of a player on the fictional L.A. Thunderbirds NFL team that holds their training camp in Santa Barbara.
- In the 1984 film Against All Odds, Jeff Bridges's character plays for a fictional team, the L.A. Outlaws.
- The 1991 action film The Last Boy Scout revolves around a fictional team, the L.A. Stallions. The Colombo episode A Bird in the Hand also utilizes this same team, the L.A. Stallions.
- The 2011 book Between the Lies by Marv Levy has a fictional NFL team from Los Angeles called the Los Angeles Leopards as one of the best teams in the NFL, along with the Portland Pioneers.
- In the John Feinstein book Cover-up: Mystery at the Super Bowl the team is called the LA Dreams.
- The 2008 Midway Games video game Blitz: The League II featured a team called the L.A. Riot which played in Los Angeles and was the antagonist to the player-created team.
- In the Mike Lupica book Fantasy League, the team in the book is the LA Bulldogs.
- In "A Star Is Born Again", a season 13 episode of The Simpsons, Ned Flanders dreams he is in Los Angeles. When James L. Brooks asks him if he wants to watch a game of football, Ned says yes, only for James to tell him "we don't have a team!" Additionally, in the season 17 episode, "Million Dollar Abie", Los Angeles is bidding against Springfield for a professional football team.

== See also ==
- Sports in Los Angeles
- Pro Bowl
- National Football League in Toronto
- History of Washington, D.C. professional baseball: A similar history regarding Major League Baseball's difficulties in maintaining professional baseball teams in the Washington, D.C. market
