= Madden (film) =

2026 sports film by David O. Russell

- Release poster
- Directed by: David O. Russell
- Written by: Cambron Clark; David O. Russell
- Produced by: Todd Black; Jason Blumenthal; David O. Russell; Jonathan Shukat; Steve Tisch
- Starring: Nicolas Cage; Christian Bale; Kathryn Hahn; John Mulaney; Sienna Miller; Shane Gillis
- Cinematography: Robert Richardson
- Edited by: Jon Poll; Alan Baumgarten; Mike Azevedo
- Music by: Marcelo Zarvos
- Production companies: Escape Artists; ShowKat; DreamCrew Entertainment; Corazon Camera
- Distributed by: Amazon MGM Studios (via Prime Video)
- Release date: November 18, 2026
- Running time: 110 minutes
- Country: United States
- Language: English
- Budget: $75 million

Madden is a 2026 American biographical sports film co-produced and directed by David O. Russell, who co-wrote it based on an earlier version by Cambron Clark. It follows the life of American football coach and commentator John Madden, who is portrayed by Nicolas Cage. The cast also features Christian Bale, Kathryn Hahn, John Mulaney, Sienna Miller, and Shane Gillis.

The film was released by Amazon MGM Studios in select U.S theaters on November 11, 2026, and became available to stream on Prime Video on November 18, 2026. The film received overwhelmingly negative reviews from critics, panning the direction.

== Plot ==
Madden depicts the life and career of John Madden, from his tenure as head coach of the Oakland Raiders and his relationship with team owner Al Davis (Christian Bale) to his transition into sports broadcasting and his role in developing the Madden NFL video game franchise. The story explores Madden's friendship and professional partnership with Davis, including the Raiders' victory in Super Bowl XI, as well as the personal and professional challenges surrounding his retirement from coaching. After leaving the sidelines, Madden becomes a television commentator before collaborating with Electronic Arts founder Trip Hawkins (John Mulaney) to create a football simulation video game. The film also depicts Madden's marriage to Virginia (Kathryn Hahn) and Davis's relationship with his wife, Carol (Sienna Miller), while examining how Madden's personality and approach to football shaped his subsequent career.

== Cast ==
- Nicolas Cage as John Madden
- Christian Bale as Al Davis
- Kathryn Hahn as Virginia Fields Madden
- John Mulaney as Trip Hawkins of Electronic Arts
- Sienna Miller as Carol Sagal Davis
- Joel Murray as Pat Summerall
- Shane Gillis as Vince McGary
- Miles Burris as Phil Villapiano
- Marshawn Lynch as Jerry Bell
- Snoop Dogg as himself
- Connor Price as Bob Costas
- Rick Hoffman as Howard Cosell
- Lorraine Nicholson as Isabelle
- Noor Alfallah as Courtney
- Colleen Camp as Mrs. Simmons

== Production ==
=== Casting ===
It was announced in May 2023 that Will Ferrell had entered early negotiations to star in the film as John Madden, with David O. Russell set to direct. However, in August 2024, Nicolas Cage would be cast to play Madden. In April 2025, Christian Bale was announced to portray Al Davis, while John Mulaney, Kathryn Hahn, and Sienna Miller were reported to be in talks to join the cast. In May, Shane Gillis joined the cast.

=== Filming ===
Principal photography began on April 24, 2025, in Atlanta. In May 2025, several actors and crew members on the set of the film allegedly walked off after Russell used the "n-word", and also tried to insert it into the film's dialogue, then "belittled" other cast and crew members over objections to his use of the word.

== Release ==
Madden was released by Amazon MGM Studios in select U.S theaters on November 11, 2026, and began to stream on Prime Video on November 18. It was previously scheduled to release on November 26, 2026.

== Reception ==
On review aggregator Rotten Tomatoes, the film holds an approval rating of 16% based on reviews from 44 critics, with an average rating of 3.7/10. On Metacritic, which uses a weighted average, the film holds a score of 26 out of 100, based on 20 critics, indicating "generally unfavorable" reviews.

G. Allen Johnson of the San Francisco Chronicle wrote, "If Madden were a football game, it would be an offensively challenged contest, filled with turnovers and penalties, the kind of performance that could get coaches fired. In other words, the opposite of the Raiders teams Madden coached in the 1970s." Tim Grierson of Screen International wrote, "Although the film covers fertile terrain, Russell's glib approach quickly irritates as there's nothing beneath the superficial flashiness." David Rooney of The Hollywood Reporter wrote, "Even if I were passionate about pigskin, however, I can't imagine getting much pleasure from this cartoonish biodrama, led by the kind of stunt acting from both principals that never lets you forget they are Giving a Performance."

In a more positive review, Owen Gleiberman of Variety wrote that the film is "crafted just well enough to let you touch the buzz of Russell's intelligence, his attraction to the high of scruffy bad behavior, and his filmmaking joy." Matthew Rudoy from Screen Rant wrote: "Both actors have fantastic chemistry that successfully makes Davis and Madden's friendship the heart of the movie. The effusive, candid, and sometimes absurd way they communicate make their interactions entertaining and genuinely funny to watch..." Also, Alex Maidy from JoBlo's Movie Network praised Cage and Bale's work, writing: "Not an outright failure, Madden should have been a lot better, considering the level of effort that Nicholas Cage and Christian Bale went into transforming themselves for it".

Mark Davis heavily criticized Bale's portrayal of his father Al in the film, noting, "I don't know what the purpose of the movie was to be real honest."
