= Mount Davis (Oakland) =

Section of Oakland Coliseum

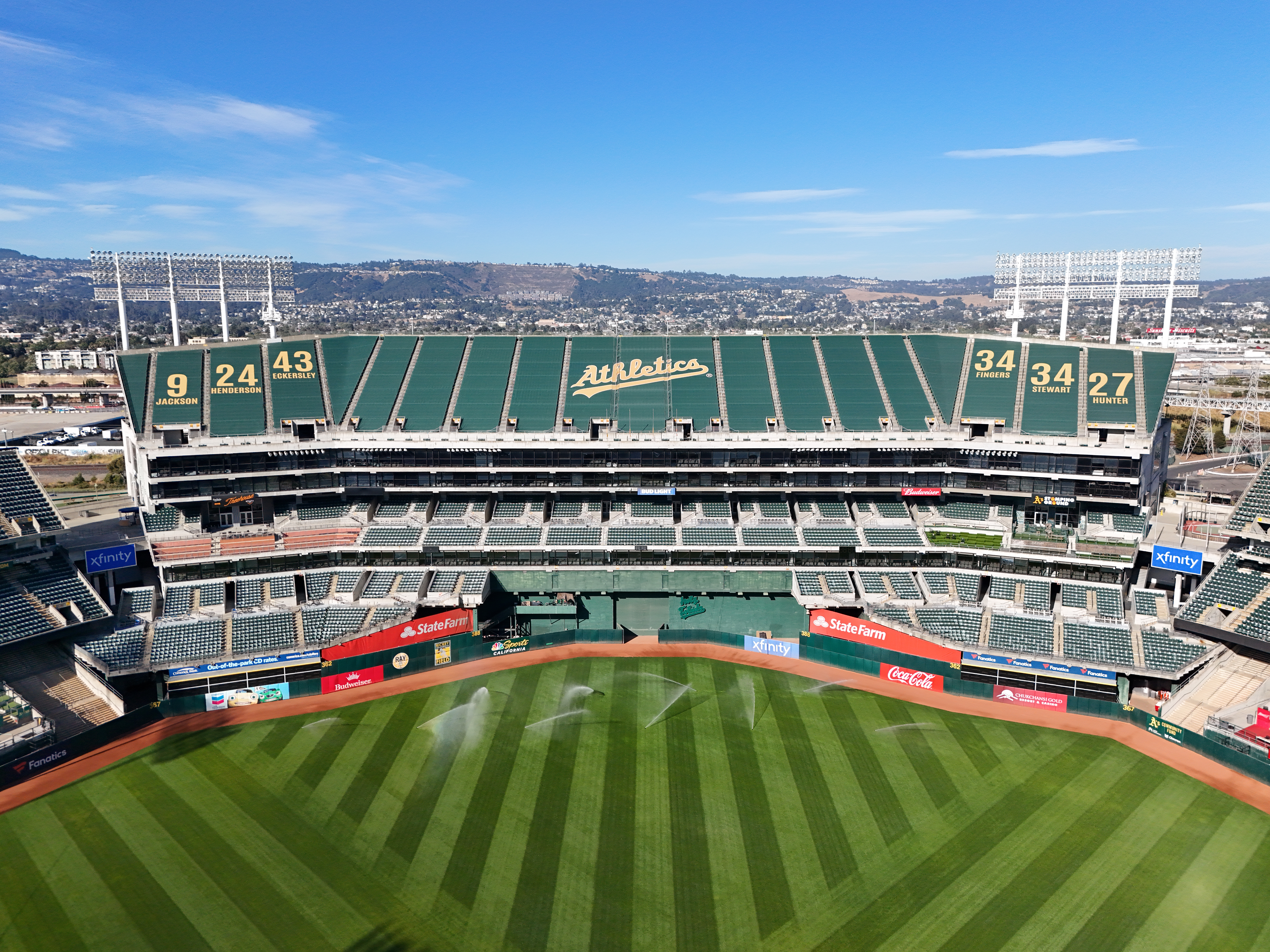
Mount Davis in 2024 with most seats covered by a tarp

Mount Davis, or Mt. Davis, is a section of 20,000 capacity seating at the Oakland Coliseum in Oakland, California, United States. It was built in 1995 at the behest of Oakland City Council with the intent of bringing the Los Angeles Raiders American football team back to Oakland and is named after former Oakland Raiders owner Al Davis. In 2006, the top-tier seating of Mount Davis was covered by tarpaulin during almost all Oakland Athletics baseball games, and the Oakland Raiders followed suit in 2013. The Raiders would relocate to Las Vegas in 2020, and the Athletics would later move to Sacramento in 2025 ahead of a planned move to Las Vegas in 2028.

== History ==
In 1982, the Oakland Raiders left Oakland because of the city's refusal to upgrade the Oakland-Alameda County Coliseum, leaving the Oakland Athletics baseball team as the sole tenants. Previously, the Raiders had to contend with two setups in the stadium within a season before their move to Los Angeles and again beginning in 1995; in baseball season, they played in an alternate home plate-to-centerfield configuration when the two teams were in season, while then maintaining a large section of portable bleachers to provide northeast sideline seating after the A's season ended, meaning season ticket holders had to contend with two different seating assignments, even in the main seating bowl. The former seating arrangement could consist of half the Raiders' home games if the A's advanced to the World Series, well into October.

In 1995, the city made an agreement with Raiders owner Al Davis that they would increase the capacity of the Coliseum in exchange for him bringing the Raiders back to Oakland. The result was a structure that colloquially became known as Mount Davis. There was criticism when Mount Davis was built as it obstructed views of the Oakland Hills. It was completed in 1996 but was criticized for being too steep and taking spectators too far away from the field of play. It had been noted to negatively affect baseball as while it provided a shield against the sun for outfielders chasing fly balls, it was an enclosed concrete stadium and had lost capacity for the Athletics.

Mount Davis cost approximately $500 million to build, with the cost shared by Alameda County and the city of Oakland. From then it cost the county and the city a shared $20 million a year in debt repayments. In 2015, Alameda County paid off the remaining $100 million of debt from its own surplus reserves, arranging for the city to continue annual payments to the county on its share of the $100 million.

== Tarpaulin ==
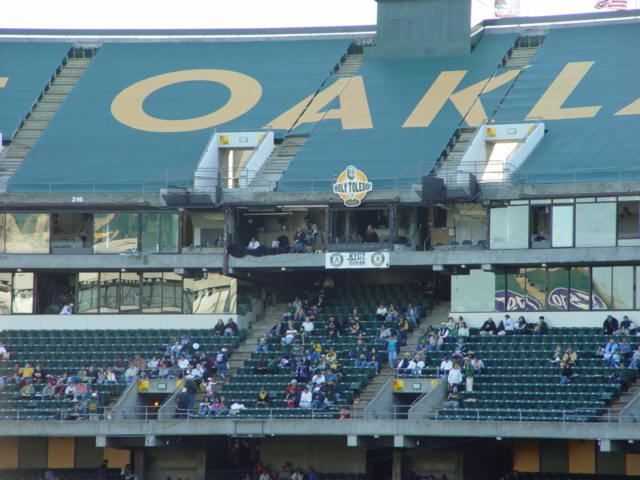
The tarp on the main grandstand; this section of tarp was removed in 2017, but the tarp on Mount Davis remains

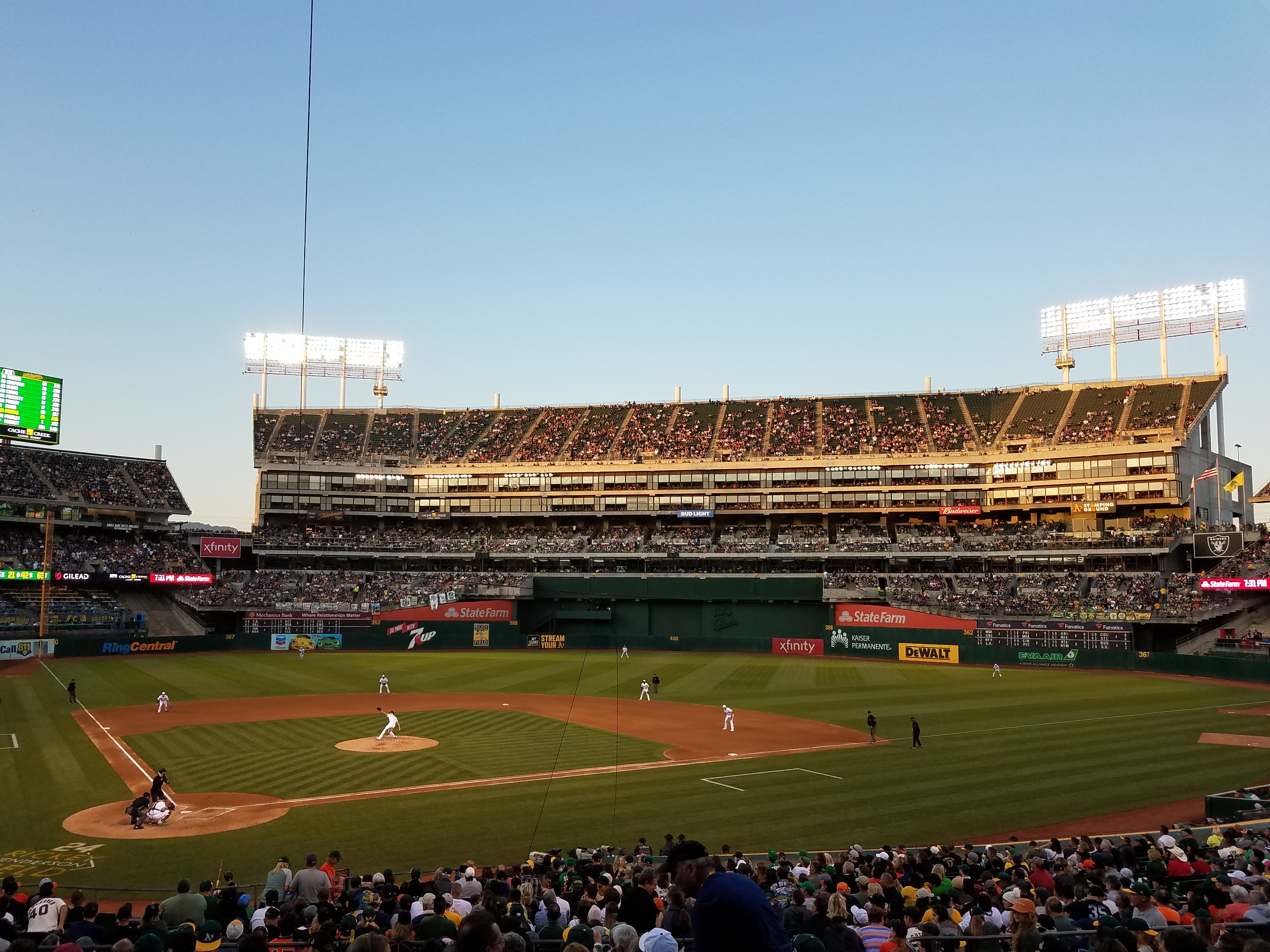
Oakland Coliseum's Mount Davis with fans seated there during a Bay Bridge Series game between the Athletics and Giants on August 24, 2019.

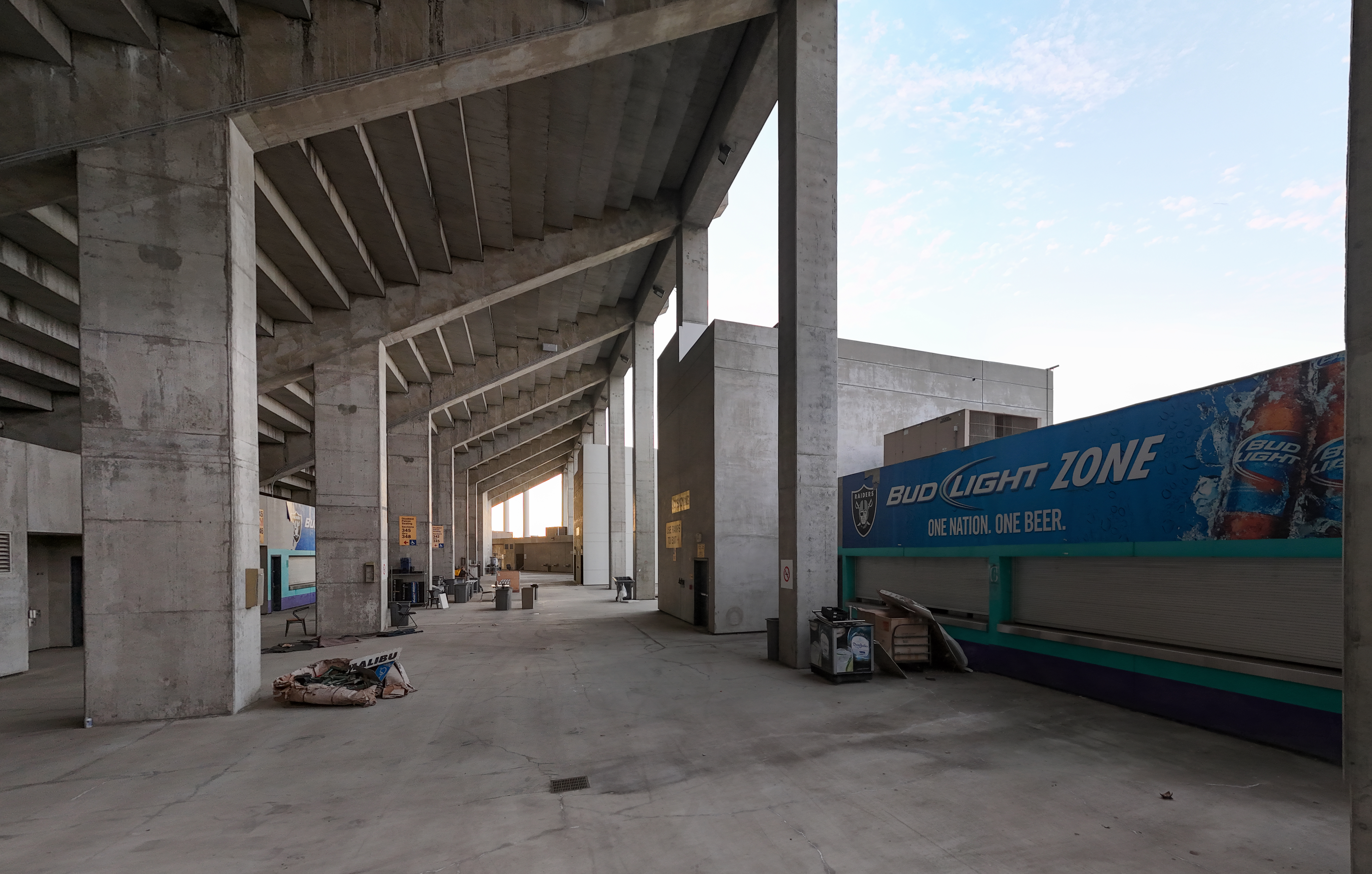
Inside the Mt. Davis concourse in 2024

Owing to low attendance, the Oakland Athletics installed a layer of tarpaulin (tarp) covering all top-tier seating areas of the Coliseum in 2006, including the top level of Mount Davis. As the Athletics could not sell advertising space on the tarp due to city regulations, various Athletics-related messages were printed instead on the tarp; the Mount Davis sections of tarp display the team's logo and retired numbers. The covered seats numbered 20,878, representing approximately 37% of seating capacity in the Coliseum.

Though the tarp can be removed, the Athletics management previously refused to do so unless the team made the World Series, as they claimed it made the stadium more "intimate". This policy was maintained to the chagrin of many fans during the 2012 American League Division Series where all other seats were sold out with demand for more tickets but the tarp was not removed. For the 2013 American League Division Series, the tarp was removed from the rest of the third deck, but not Mount Davis. However, in 2017, Athletics president Dave Kaval announced that some sections of tarp – though not those on Mount Davis – would be removed for at least the remainder of the 2017 season. Done in response to the long-standing fan complaints, this move added back 12,103 seats to the Coliseum during Athletics games, leaving the 8,775 seats on Mount Davis still covered.

In 2013, the Oakland Raiders also started covering Mount Davis with tarp owing to the National Football League television blackout policies which obligate teams to black out the game if they cannot sell more than 85% stadium capacity. Over the previous few years, the Raiders had been forced to black out more home games than were televised. This made the Oakland-Alameda County Coliseum the smallest stadium in the National Football League. Under NFL rules, Mount Davis had to remain tarped all season long, regardless of whether they made the NFL playoffs or not. The Raiders kept Mount Davis tarped from 2013 until the team moved to Las Vegas in 2020, though after 2015, the NFL suspended its blackout policies.

On July 21, 2018, the tarp on Mount Davis was removed by the A's for an interleague matchup against the Bay Bridge rival San Francisco Giants in a successful attempt to break a Coliseum attendance record. Tickets were sold for $10 apiece. In 2019, the A's again opened Mount Davis for fans during the Bay Bridge Series against the Giants and for the 2019 American League Wild Card Game against the Tampa Bay Rays. With the tarps off for the wild card game, they set a record for the highest attendance at a Wild Card game at 54,005.

The tarps to Mount Davis were not opened during the final games played in the stadium by the Oakland Athletics despite fan interest and pressure in the section being opened.

When the tarps were used for the section a number of security guards were placed to prevent people from accessing the section, the concourse of the section was also filled with junk after it stopped being used.

== Reception ==
The section blocked views of the Oakland Hills beyond the outfield wall in its baseball configuration, and one of the sideline sides in its football configuration that existed before its construction. As a result, some media critics viewed it as an eyesore in retrospect. The use of public funds in its construction, only for the teams occupying the stadium to relocate, has also been criticized.
