= Carol Davis (American football) =

American businesswoman and sports team owner (1932–2025)

- Carol and Al Davis
- Born: Carol Sagal; January 16, 1932; New York City, U.S.
- Died: October 24, 2025 (aged 93); Oakland, California, U.S.
- Education: New York University
- Occupations: Fashion buyer and sports franchise owner
- Years active: 1950s–2025
- Known for: Co-owner of the Las Vegas Raiders
- Spouse: Al Davis (m. 1954; died 2011)
- Children: Mark Davis

Carol Davis (née Sagal; January 16, 1932 – October 24, 2025) was an American businesswoman and sports franchise owner. She was part-owner of the Las Vegas Raiders of the National Football League (NFL). Davis inherited the team from her husband, Al Davis, upon his death in 2011.

== Life and career ==
Davis was born on January 16, 1932, in New York City, where she also grew up. Her parents ran a successful department store in downtown Brooklyn. Davis graduated from New York University with a marketing degree. She worked as a buyer, selecting designer clothing for retail stores, before her husband joined the Oakland Raiders. Carol and Al Davis married in a synagogue in Brooklyn in 1954 after his discharge from the U.S. Army; the couple established a first home in Atlantic Beach, near Al's parents. They settled in the East Bay in California after he began with the Raiders in 1963.

Carol Davis mostly remained behind the scenes with the Raiders but was cognizant of how the team was performing. She was a fixture in the owners' suite at their games. Oakland City Council president Ignacio De La Fuente said that "she would keep Al realistic about things in our negotiations." In late 1979, she suffered a serious heart attack which placed her in the hospital and in a coma for three weeks, but she later recovered completely.

Al suggested in 1997 that Carol would succeed him should he no longer be able to run the Raiders franchise, saying it again in 2006. They had one son, Mark (born 1955). After her husband died in 2011, she and Mark held controlling interest in the Raiders. However, Davis mostly left the Raiders in the hands of her son, who took over his father's old post of managing general partner and operating head of the franchise. Davis continued attending some games and was present for the groundbreaking of Allegiant Stadium in 2017. On September 21, 2020, she lit the Al Davis memorial torch prior to the Raiders first-ever game at the stadium. In 2021, she presented former Raiders coach Tom Flores for induction into the Pro Football Hall of Fame.

Davis died on October 24, 2025, at age 93. Two days later, Mark lit the Al Davis memorial torch in her honor.
