= Amy Trask =

American lawyer

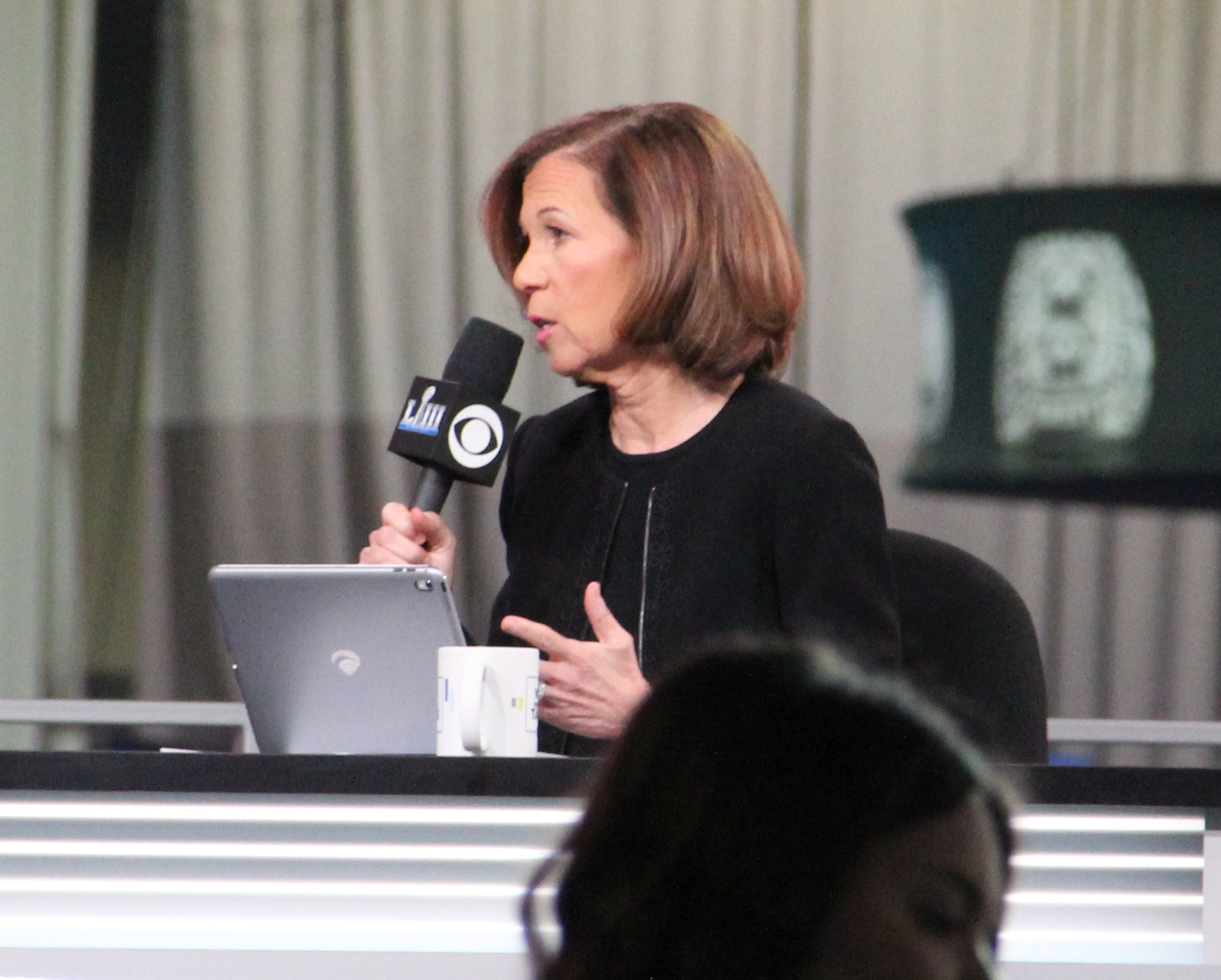
- Trask in 2019
- Born: April 26, 1961 (age 65); Brentwood, California, U.S.
- Education: University of California, Berkeley (BA); University of Southern California (JD)
- Occupations: Sports Executive, Lawyer, Host on CBS Sports Network, Podcaster, Author
- Known for: Former CEO of the Oakland Raiders

Amy Trask (born April 26, 1961) is an American sports executive, author, and lawyer from California. She is the former CEO of the Oakland Raiders. Trask has also been referred to as the "Princess of Darkness" by Raiders fans.

== Education ==
Trask grew up in the Brentwood district of Los Angeles and graduated from University of California, Berkeley in 1982 with a B.A. degree in political science. She became a fan of the Oakland Raiders while attending Berkeley and was a member of Phi Beta Kappa. After graduating from Berkeley, Trask received a J.D. from the Gould School of Law at the University of Southern California. She began law school in 1982, the same year the Raiders moved to Los Angeles.

== Career with the Raiders ==
In 1983, Trask interned at the Los Angeles Raiders legal department. Trask was admitted to the State Bar of California in 1985. Trask began her legal career at a law firm in Los Angeles and rejoined the Raiders in 1987. Trask was appointed chief executive of the Raiders in 1997. She resigned from the Raiders on May 11, 2013. After her resignation, Trask was referred to as the “glue” that held the organization together.

== Today ==
Since 2013, Trask has served as an analyst for CBS Sports and CBS Sports Network, appearing regularly on That Other Pregame Show and periodically on The NFL Today. Trask is one of the original group of panelists appearing on the first-ever all-women's sports talk show, We Need To Talk on CBS Sports Network. Trask is a co-host of the What the Football podcast, available on most major podcast platforms. Trask has also written a book titled You Negotiate Like a Girl on her experience as an executive in the NFL.

Trask serves on the advisory board of the Los Angeles Sports and Entertainment Commission.

Trask served on the board of directors of Far Niente Wine Estates from 2013 through 2016.

Trask served as CEO of Big3, a 3-on-3 professional basketball league founded by Ice Cube and Jeff Kwatinetz, during its inaugural season in 2017, and then served as chairman of the board of Big3 through October 2022.

Trask was named as a Sports Business Journal Game Changer in 2011. Trask received a 2017 WISE Woman of the Year Award awarded by Women in Sports and Events (WISE), a 2018 Campanile Excellence in Achievement Award awarded by the UC Berkeley Foundation and the Cal Alumni Association (University of California at Berkeley), and a 2020 Top Women in Media Award awarded by Cynopsis Media. In 2019, as part of the National Football League's commemoration of its 100-year anniversary, Trask was named as one of the top 100 Greatest Game Changers in NFL history. In 2023, Trask was named by Sports Illustrated Cal Sports Report as one of the top 100 individuals associated with University of California athletics.
