= Mark Davis (American football) =

American businessman and sports team owner (born 1955)

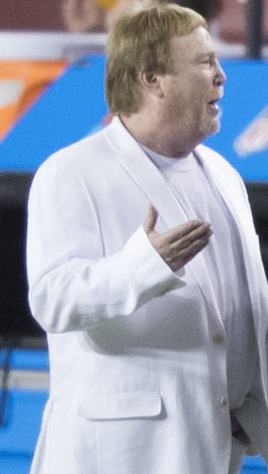
- Davis in 2017
- Born: Mark M Davis; May 18, 1955 (age 71); Brooklyn, New York, U.S.
- Education: California State University, Chico
- Occupations: Businessman and sports franchise owner
- Years active: 2011–present
- Known for: Principal owner of the Las Vegas Raiders and Las Vegas Aces
- Parent(s): Al Davis; Carol Davis
- Awards: 3× WNBA Champion (2022, 2023, 2025)

Mark M Davis (born May 18, 1955) is an American businessman and sports franchise owner. He is the controlling owner and managing general partner of the Las Vegas Raiders of the National Football League (NFL) and the owner of the Las Vegas Aces of the Women's National Basketball Association (WNBA). His father, Al Davis, was the principal owner of the Raiders from 1972 until his death in 2011. Upon his father's death, Davis and his mother, Carol, inherited ownership of the Raiders, with Mark taking over as operating head of the franchise. As of October 2024, his estimated net worth was $2.3 billion.

== Early years ==
Davis was born on May 18, 1955, in Brooklyn, New York, to Al and Carol Davis. He is a graduate of California State University, Chico.

Prior to inheriting co-ownership of the team, Davis was involved in the retail part of the Raiders' business where he helped develop their Raider Image stores. He also spent time in the Raiders equipment department where in 1986, he developed the muff-style hand warmer for football. In 1980, Davis represented Raiders player Cliff Branch in contract negotiations with the team which resulted in a deal that included an annuity (active until Branch's death in 2019) and got Mark expelled from his father's house for being too close to the players. He later lived with Branch when the team moved to Los Angeles.

== Professional sports ==
=== Oakland / Las Vegas Raiders ===
Davis and his mother, Carol, inherited the team after the death of his father, Al Davis, in 2011. Mark and Carol owned a 47 percent share of the Raiders through Al's company, A. D. Football, Inc. with the stake contractually structured to give them controlling interest. Mark took over his father's old post of managing general partner. Even before Carol died in October 2025, Mark was operating head of the franchise, controlling the Raiders' day-to-day operations and representing the Raiders at owners' meetings.

==== Relocation to Las Vegas ====
Davis gained control of the team towards the end of the Raiders lease with the Oakland Coliseum, a facility that dates back to 1965 and had many problems related to its age. It was also at the time the only facility that still housed both a Major League Baseball team and an NFL team, a major point of contention for both leagues. As such, Davis put himself in charge of an effort to construct a new stadium for the Raiders, an issue his father Al was never able to solve in his tenure as owner. He initially stated a desire to keep the Raiders in Oakland (preferably on the Coliseum site) or the immediate area. Because the city lacked a stadium plan, Davis began to communicate with representatives in other cities such as Los Angeles, San Antonio and Las Vegas.

In late February 2015, Davis announced that the Raiders would pursue a shared stadium in Carson, California, with Dean Spanos and the San Diego Chargers. Davis' and Spanos' proposal directly competed with and eventually lost to Rams' owner Stan Kroenke and his proposed stadium in Inglewood.

Until the Carson vote, Davis was also actively working towards a resolution in Oakland. In an interview, he said "we are trying everything possible to get something done in Oakland right on the same exact site we're on right now". However, after a dispute over rent in Oakland, whereby the city raised the rent on the team after the Carson plan failed and because Davis saw that Oakland lacked a credible plan, Davis began exclusive discussions with Las Vegas. He initially teamed up with Sheldon Adelson to get a stadium in Las Vegas though after funding was acquired for the stadium Adelson was cut out of the deal. On March 27, 2017, the National Football League officially approved the Raiders move from Oakland to Las Vegas in a 31–1 vote, ensuring them a new stadium in the process.

=== Las Vegas Aces ===
On January 14, 2021, Davis agreed to purchase the Las Vegas Aces of the Women's National Basketball Association from MGM Resorts International. The purchase was approved by the WNBA and NBA on February 12, 2021. Prior to owning the team, Davis had been an Aces' season ticket holder and a frequent attendee at home games. Davis said that discussions to purchase the Aces began shortly after he remarked to MGM Resorts CEO Bill Hornbuckle at a game that the players should get paid more. Prior to making a formal bid, he had a meeting with Aces forward A'ja Wilson to gauge her thoughts about him taking over the team. Shortly after the purchase of the team by Davis, ground was broken on a training facility for the Aces in Henderson next to the Raiders facility. The 50,000 square foot facility which was the first of its kind in the WNBA, opened in April 2023 and houses the Aces’ practice facility, offices, training room, weight room, hydrotherapy space, physical therapy area, locker rooms, a lecture hall, player and alumni lounges, and an on-site day care center. In May 2021, Davis hired former LSU Lady Tigers basketball head coach Nikki Fargas as team president. On December 31, 2021, Becky Hammon was hired as head coach in a deal that made her the highest paid coach in the WNBA. The Aces won the 2022 WNBA Finals in four games, bringing the franchise its first championship, Las Vegas its first professional sports championship, and Davis his first championship as a professional sports owner.

== Philosophy and management style ==
In his ownership of the Raiders, Davis has focused on business matters while leaving on-field matters to the football operations staff. This form of management is in stark contrast to his father, who was well known as one of the most hands-on owners in professional sports. Al Davis became general manager of the Raiders in 1966 after returning from a short stint as AFL commissioner, and remained head of football operations after becoming principal owner in 1972. He exercised near-complete control over both business and football matters until his death.

In 2013, Mark Davis fired the Raiders public relations director because of a Sports Illustrated article that was critical of Davis' father. Davis stated that the director's replacement needed to understand the importance of his father's legacy and actively protect it.

In his ownership of the Aces, Davis has focused on business matters while also dabbling in team operation matters when necessary.

=== On domestic violence in the NFL ===
Davis spoke out publicly on the issue of domestic violence in the NFL, following San Francisco 49ers defensive lineman Ray McDonald's arrest on August 31, 2014. Davis disagreed with Jed York's decision to keep McDonald on the active roster, proposing that the league should suspend with pay any player arrested while "the investigation moves forward." This was the first proposal of this kind following the Ray Rice assault video surfacing, that specifically called for an immediate suspension of players rather than leaving the decision to suspend up to the respective franchises themselves. In March 2015, Davis again went public on the issue of domestic violence, shutting down rumors that the Raiders' started negotiations with Greg Hardy, who was convicted on domestic abuse charges earlier that year. The Raiders' organization has traditionally been vocal about domestic violence issues, with direct involvement with the Tracey Biletnikoff Foundation, created by Hall of Famer Fred Biletnikoff to support community substance abuse treatment and domestic violence programs.

=== On social justice and player protests ===
Davis has spoken out publicly on the controversial National Anthem protests in the NFL, where players kneel during the playing of the pre-game National Anthem to protest social injustice and police brutality on African Americans. Davis originally preferred his players to stand, but after comments made by President Donald Trump calling protesting players "sons of bitches" and saying they should be fired for kneeling, Davis changed his stance. In a public statement the following weekend he stated, "About a year ago before our Tennessee game I met with Derek Carr and Khalil Mack to ask their permission to have Tommie Smith light the torch for my father before the game in Mexico City," Davis told ESPN's Paul Gutierrez. "I explained to them I was asking their permission because I had previously told them that I would prefer that they not protest while in Raiders uniform. And should they have something to say once their uniform was off, I might go up there with them. Over the last year, though," Davis continued, "the streets have gotten hot and there has been a lot of static in the air and recently fuel has been added to the fire. I can no longer ask our team not to say something while they are in a Raider uniform. The only thing I can ask them to do is do it with class. Do it with pride. Not only do we have to tell people there is something wrong, we have to come up with answers. That's the challenge that's in front of us as Americans and as human beings."

In May 2018, Davis abstained from an NFL owner resolution on the anthem protests that called for players to stand or stay in the locker room until after the anthem is played or face a team fine for kneeling, locking arms, or raising their fist. Davis abstained along with San Francisco 49ers owner Jed York after speaking out on social justice issues to the other owners.

In April 2022, Davis stated that he would welcome Colin Kaepernick to the team with open arms if general manager Dave Ziegler and head coach Josh McDaniels wished to sign him stating that he believed in him and that "he sacrificed a lot of the things that he could've been doing in his life to get a message across about police violence and equity and inclusion in America, and I stand by that."

=== On the Washington Commanders workplace conduct investigation ===
Davis has spoken out in favor of a written report of the Washington Commanders workplace conduct investigation, and the release of such a report, in stark contrast to the other NFL team owners who oppose releasing a report, and the NFL announcing a report would not be forthcoming. A year-long independent investigation into the Washington Commanders' workplace culture under owner Daniel Snyder, led by lawyer Beth Wilkinson, was concluded in July 2021 and found that incidents of sexual harassment, bullying, and intimidation were commonplace throughout the organization under his ownership. Davis said that the public and victims deserve a written report. Information leaked from the investigation in October 2021 showed that Raiders head coach Jon Gruden, then employed by ESPN, wrote emails over a 10-year period to then-Washington Commanders president Bruce Allen that included racist, homophobic, and misogynistic language. Gruden resigned as head coach of the Raiders shortly after the emails were leaked to and reported on by The New York Times. Davis has in addition criticized the NFL for not disclosing the Gruden emails to him and the Raiders organization when the league discovered them in June 2021, as part of the investigation, so action could have been taken by him and the team before the start of the 2021 season.

=== On player pay and accommodations in the WNBA ===
Davis has spoken out in favor of increased pay and better accommodations for players in the WNBA. In response to criticisms of WNBA player salaries due to a low league salary cap and what is considered sub-standard league accommodations from Aces player Liz Cambage after Davis signed Aces head coach Becky Hammon to the most lucrative head coaching contract in WNBA history worth over $1 million Davis stated "We have to be paying these women commensurate to what their abilities are and what they're doing. On the front office side and the coaching side, there is no salary cap. Becky Hammon didn't want to be a million-dollar coach. But I wanted her to be a million-dollar coach. Because I thought that she would be, in a sense, when the American Football League started, they had a television contract. And they had Joe Namath. And Joe Namath had the $400,000 contract and he sparked the imagination of everybody that 'This league is real.' "I felt that giving Becky Hammon the million-dollar contract ... would then show everybody that there is value here. Liz Cambage kind of came out with a statement, and I agree 100 percent with what she says. That the players do deserve more money. That they don't need to be flying on commercial flights. ... I agree with all of those things and those are things that the Las Vegas Aces are going to be champions of, and that we're going to grow for the good of everybody in this league."

== Personal life ==
Davis says he is a food connoisseur and has said that his favorite restaurants include Dan Tana's in Los Angeles, California, Joe's Stone Crab in Miami Beach, Florida and P.F. Chang's. Davis is known for his signature bowl haircut and for driving a 1997 Dodge Caravan SE which is outfitted with a bubble-top Mark III conversion kit as well as a VCR mounted to the ceiling.

Davis donated $10,000 to the Gridiron PAC between 2016 and 2017. In June 2022, Davis donated $1 million to the Uvalde Consolidated Independent School District to help fortify the schools following the Robb Elementary School shooting after talking to former Raiders player Vann McElroy who lives in Uvalde.

In 1986, Mark Davis invented the muff-style hand-warmer that football players use in cold weather.

== Awards and honors ==
- 3× WNBA Champion (2022, 2023, 2025) (as owner of the Las Vegas Aces)
