= Al Davis =

American football coach and executive (1929–2011)

- Davis c. 1970

Personal information
- Born: July 4, 1929; Brockton, Massachusetts, U.S.
- Died: October 8, 2011 (aged 82); Oakland, California, U.S.

Career information
- High school: Erasmus Hall (Brooklyn, New York)
- College: Syracuse

Career history

Coaching
- Adelphi (1950–1951) Offensive line coach; Fort Belvoir (1953) Head coach; Baltimore Colts (1954) Scout; The Citadel (1955–1956) Offensive line coach; USC (1957–1959) Offensive line coach; Los Angeles / San Diego Chargers (1960–1962) Wide receivers coach; Oakland Raiders (1963–1965) Head coach

Operations
- American Football League (1966) Commissioner; Oakland Raiders (1966–1971) Part owner & general manager; Los Angeles / Oakland Raiders (1972–2011) Principal owner & general manager

Awards and highlights
- 3× Super Bowl champion (XI, XV, XVIII); 2× NFL Executive of the Year (1976, 2002); AFL Coach of the Year (1963)

Head coaching record
- Regular season: 23–16–3 (.583)
- Coaching profile at Pro Football Reference
- Executive profile at Pro Football Reference
- Pro Football Hall of Fame

Allen R. Davis (July 4, 1929 – October 8, 2011) was an American professional football executive and coach. He was the managing general partner, principal owner and de facto general manager for the Oakland Raiders of the National Football League (NFL) for 39 years, from 1972 until his death in 2011. Prior to becoming principal owner of the Raiders, he served as the team's head coach from 1963 to 1965 and as a part-owner from 1966 to 1971, assuming both positions while the Raiders were members of the American Football League (AFL). He served as the AFL commissioner in 1966.

Known for his motto "Just win, baby", Davis managed the Raiders becoming one of the NFL's most successful and popular teams. The franchise enjoyed its greatest successes during the 1970s and 1980s where it was a perennial playoff contender and won three Super Bowl titles. He was inducted into the Pro Football Hall of Fame in 1992.

Davis was active in civil rights, refusing to allow the Raiders to play in any city where black and white players had to stay in separate hotels. He was the first NFL owner in the modern era to hire a black head coach (Art Shell), the first to hire a female chief executive (Amy Trask), and the first NFL owner to hire a Latino head coach (Tom Flores). He remains the only person to have served as a scout, assistant general manager, general manager, assistant coach, a head coach, a commissioner (of a league), and an owner of a team.

== Early life ==
Davis was born in Brockton, Massachusetts, to a Jewish family. Davis's father, Louis Davis, worked in a variety of trades in Massachusetts; having found some success in the garment manufacturing field. He moved to Brooklyn, New York, in 1934 with his wife, Rose, and their two sons, Jerry and Allen. Louis Davis rented a sixth-floor walkup for his family off Utica Avenue, became very successful in the garment trade, and put his two sons through college before seeking a more comfortable home in Atlantic Beach, New York. Although there are a number of stories of Louis Davis backing his younger son in anything so long as the boy did not get caught or back down from a confrontation, most of these stories derive from Al Davis. Childhood friends depicted him as more of a talker than a fighter, although very good with his mouth. Young Al's sport of choice was basketball, and he gained a reputation of a hard player, if not the most skillful. As a boy, he was determined to play for Coach Al Badain at Erasmus Hall High School, passing up the opportunity to attend school closer to his house. Although he was only a reserve on the Erasmus team, and did not play much, Davis studied Badain's coaching techniques, and felt he learned much from him. In the 1980s, with Badain ill and in need, Davis brought his elderly former coach to the West Coast to witness his Raiders in the Super Bowl, and paid the man's debts.

Despite Davis's slight role on his high school team, Raiders media guides later published descriptions of Davis which depicted him as a schoolboy star, only to have the claims scaled back—slightly—in future editions after reporters investigated the matter. His lack of football playing experience (he did play football for his high school fraternity) made him one of the few to be a head coach in the NFL or AFL despite never having played even for the high school varsity.

Davis graduated from high school in January 1947, immediately enrolling at Wittenberg College in Springfield, Ohio at age 17. The school had recruited Davis, although it did not extend him a scholarship. He spent a semester there, occupying himself with baseball and plans to transfer to a higher-profile school. In mid-1947, he transferred to Syracuse University. Although Davis repeatedly tried out for the various varsity teams, the height of his athletic career at Syracuse was warming the bench for the junior varsity baseball team. Frustrated by this, he briefly transferred to Hartwick College, also in New York State, in 1948, but soon returned to Syracuse. Despite Davis's lack of athletic success, he commonly mingled with varsity athletes, many of whom assumed he was also one but on another team. Unsuccessful in his efforts to join the men's basketball team, Davis became interested in football strategy, and haunted the football team's practices until asked to leave by the head coach, suspicious of Davis for taking notes. Davis also took the academic courses in football strategy given by the assistant coaches, and ordinarily attended only by players.

== Early coaching career ==
=== College coach ===
While job hunting, he introduced himself as "Davis from Syracuse", likely intentionally to conflate with Ernie Davis, star halfback for the school's football team. Turned down at Hofstra University and by Bill Altenberg, athletic director at Adelphi University (both on Long Island), he approached Adelphi's president. What went on between the two men is not known; his biographer Mark Ribowsky suggests Davis used a combination of "bluff and con," but a half hour after Altenberg dismissed Davis from his office, he received a call from the president that he had a new freshman football coach.

=== Military service ===
In 1952, with his student deferral ended upon receipt of his master's degree, Davis was inducted into the United States Army. He quickly secured a place attached to a public relations unit near Syracuse, and set about obtaining a place on one of the coaching staff for the military's football teams. General Stanley Scott of Fort Belvoir, Virginia, obtained Davis's services in 1953 as football coach for his post's football squad. At the time, military football was taken very seriously; the teams were well-stocked with drafted college stars, and often scrimmaged National Football League teams. Davis coached Fort Belvoir, just south of Washington, D.C., to a record of eight wins, two losses, and one tie (8–2–1), missing a chance to play in the Poinsettia Bowl in San Diego because of a final-game loss to the nearby Quantico Marine Base. As a private first class, he was often coaching players of a higher rank, including officers. Near the end of 1952, he was called to testify before a congressional committee investigating whether athletes were being coddled in the military. Although most of Davis's team was sent to Korea, he remained at Fort Belvoir until his discharge in 1954. While coaching in the army, Davis sold scouting information about his players to NFL teams. One NFL executive who contacted Davis was Pete Rozelle of the Los Angeles Rams, but as Rozelle had been allocated no money, Davis gave him no information.

=== Scouting and return to college coaching ===
After military service, Davis married his fiancée, Carol Sagal, in a Brooklyn synagogue; the couple established a first home in Atlantic Beach, near Al Davis's parents. Davis worked for a year as a freelance scout for the Baltimore Colts of the NFL. He had considerable knowledge of the players he had had on his roster or coached against, and advised the Colts which players to offer contracts to or draft as they returned to civilian life. Davis cultivated the Colts' head coach, Weeb Ewbank, hoping Ewbank's connections would lead to a coaching job for Davis, and these efforts paid off in January 1955, when Davis was hired by The Citadel in South Carolina as an assistant to first-year head coach John Sauer. In contrast to the glory won by its alumni in war, the South Carolina military academy's football team had lost every game the previous season, and previous head coach John McMillan was dismissed after two seasons. Davis stated, in his interview, that he would be able to persuade small-town boys from the Northeast to attend The Citadel, which often had difficulty in recruiting star players because of its regimented lifestyle. He was successful in his recruiting, although not all remained past the first training camp, at Parris Island Marine base.

During games, Davis was stationed in the press box, calling plays which were generally run by Sauer without modification. The Citadel unexpectedly began the season by winning five of its first six games, although it lost the next three to end the season 5–4. Davis received much credit for his role in The Citadel's success, although losing Sauer's regard through too-aggressive self-promotion. The 1956 season was less successful, as the team finished 3–5–1. Sauer resigned at the end of the season; Davis unsuccessfully sought the head coaching position and then resigned; Ribowsky records that there were allegations of payments and other benefits to players in violation of NCAA rules; he also states that Davis pressured professors to change grades to keep student-athletes eligible to play football. By the time he left The Citadel, Davis had already arranged his next job, at the University of Southern California (USC) in Los Angeles.

Davis was an effective recruiter as a USC assistant coach, bringing one prospect, Angelo Coia to the Los Angeles Coliseum at night, and as the lights were slowly turned off, asked the student to imagine himself playing there before 100,000 people. Coia played for USC and later worked for the Raider front office. When Davis arrived, USC was on NCAA probation for allowing alumni to surreptitiously give money to players, and had not been permitted to play in a bowl game after the 1956 season; these sanctions hampered Davis's first two seasons at USC, 1957 and 1958, during which the team posted a combined 5-14-1 record. The head coach, Don Clark, came to rely heavily on Davis. Clark and Davis hoped that 1959 would bring a conference championship and the chance to play in the Rose Bowl, but in April 1959 USC was sanctioned by the NCAA again, this time for inducing recruits signed by other schools into breaking their letters of intent. Not allowed to play on television, USC won its first eight games before losing to UCLA and Notre Dame. Despite the defeats, the team was Pacific Coast Conference champions, but because of the sanctions could not play in the Rose Bowl. Clark resigned after the season; although Davis put in for the position, it went to another assistant, John McKay, who did not keep Davis on his staff.

=== Chargers assistant ===
Davis had met Los Angeles Rams coach Sid Gillman in Atlantic City at a coaching clinic; the NFL coach had been impressed that Davis had sat in the front row, taken copious notes, and had asked many questions afterwards. Gillman was fired after the 1959 season, but was quickly hired by the Los Angeles Chargers of the startup American Football League (AFL) for their debut 1960 season. He hired Davis as backfield coach on a coaching staff which included future hall of famer Chuck Noll as well as future AFL head coach and NFL general manager Jack Faulkner. Gillman later said that he hired Davis for his success both as a coach and as a recruiter, and because "Al had that knack of telling people what they wanted to hear. He was very persuasive."

The AFL's rules were crafted to encourage wide-open, high-scoring football. In later years, much to Gillman's anger, Davis hinted that he had designed the Chargers' offense, or at least deserved partial credit. The team initially proved successful, winning the AFL Western Division in 1960 and 1961, although losing each time in the AFL Championship Game to the Houston Oilers.

One player whom Davis recommended to the Chargers, and then secured, was wide receiver Lance Alworth of Arkansas, who was a first-round selection of NFL San Francisco 49ers in the 1962 NFL draft. Unwilling to give the 49ers a chance to sign him, Davis raced onto the field at the conclusion of Alworth's final college game and signed him to a contract under the goalpost as 49ers head coach Red Hickey watched helplessly from the stands. Davis later stated, "I knew it wasn't safe to let Alworth go to the dressing room." In 1978, Davis was selected by Alworth to introduce him at his induction to the Pro Football Hall of Fame in Canton, Ohio.

== First stint with the Raiders (1963–1965) ==
=== Background and hiring ===
Early in the 1962 season, Davis spoke with Oakland Raiders owner F. Wayne Valley about their head coaching job. However, Davis was not then interested. After the team's disastrous 1962 season, in which it lost its first 13 games before defeating a Boston Patriots team demoralized from having just been eliminated from playoff contention, Valley sought to replace head coach Red Conkright.

A number of names were rumored to be in contention for the Raiders head coaching job, from Green Bay Packers coach Vince Lombardi to Lou Agase, former coach of the Canadian Football League's Toronto Argonauts. On January 1, 1963, Davis met with Valley and the other Raiders general partner, Ed McGah. According to witnesses present at the negotiations, Davis did not have a high opinion of Valley and McGah, indicating during their absence that they did not know the right questions to ask. They offered him a one-year contract as head coach. He declined, insisting on a multi-year deal as both head coach and general manager, with complete control over football operations, to which they eventually agreed and settled on a three-year stint at an annual salary of $20,000. According to Davis biographer Ira Simmons, the date that Davis came to Oakland, January 18, 1963, "was probably one of the three or four most important dates in AFL history. Maybe NFL history too." Valley later stated, "we needed someone who wanted to win so badly, he would do anything. Everywhere I went, people told me what a son of a bitch Al Davis was, so I figured he must be doing something right."

The Raiders team had been a late addition to the original AFL in 1960; the franchise had been awarded when the owners of the AFL Minnesota team had been induced to join the NFL instead. While it inherited the departed Minnesota team's draft picks, it had little else. The franchise, originally nicknamed the Señors (changed to Raiders after columnists raised objections) was not established until the other AFL teams had had the opportunity to sign players and coaches, a handicap which contributed to it being the only team to post a losing record in each of the AFL's first three seasons. The University of California refused to let it play at Memorial Stadium in Berkeley, and no other facility in the East Bay was suitable even for temporary use, forcing it to play its first two seasons at Kezar Stadium and Candlestick Park, both located across the bay in San Francisco.

Valley and his group purchased the Raiders in 1961. Valley and his partners used the threat of leaving to induce city officials to construct Frank Youell Field, a temporary facility in downtown Oakland next to the Nimitz Freeway which held about 15,000 people, the use of which was shared with high schools. Planning for a larger stadium — what became the Oakland Coliseum — began, but there was no guarantee that it would ever be built.

=== Youngest coach in the AFL ===
Davis immediately began to try to build the Raiders into a championship team, both on the field and in the front office. Many Raiders players and front-office employees were dismissed. Since their first season, the Raiders had used hand-me-down black and gold uniforms from the University of the Pacific in Stockton. Davis had been impressed by the black uniforms of the football players at West Point, which he felt made them look larger. Soon after he arrived, the Raiders adopted their now-iconic silver and black motif. The Raiders' offices were on an open mezzanine overlooking a downtown Oakland hotel lobby; Davis got Valley to move them to more private facilities. With no agreement between the AFL and NFL, drafted players often went to the higher bidder. Davis could not hope to outbid the NFL and drafted players with remaining college eligibility, hoping to sign them once they finished their careers. Thus, his hopes of success for 1963 rested on what trades he could make, and in signing players cut by other teams.

Davis's methods of acquiring these players caused other teams' executives to regard him with respect and caution. He acquired All-AFL guard Bob Mischak from the New York Jets for Dan Ficca without telling Jets coach/general manager Weeb Ewbank that Ficca would not be released from his military service until after the season began. Wide receiver Art Powell had played out his contract with New York and become a free agent, and had apparently been signed by the Buffalo Bills. Davis learned that the Powell contract had been made before the season ended, and thus constituted tampering. He signed Powell himself, and the Bills did not contest it.

Gillman's Chargers teams had used high-powered offenses. Davis sought to increase their power. From the opening of training camp, he sought to motivate his players, using techniques he had learned in the military. From the start, players saw phrases like "commitment to excellence" and, on schedules next to the time of games, "We go to war!" In the season opener, at Houston's Jeppesen Stadium against the Oilers, the two-touchdown underdog Raiders won, 24–13, then came home to defeat the Bills 35–17. A home loss to the Patriots was next, followed by an East Coast road trip on which the Raiders lost all three games. To growing excitement in Oakland, the Raiders did not lose the rest of the season, finishing 10–4, a game behind the division champion Chargers, whom the Raiders defeated twice. Davis was voted AFL Coach of the Year. The 1963 Oakland Raiders were the only pro football team to improve its record by nine victories under the 14-game schedule.

Although the team slipped to 5–7–2 in 1964, it rebounded to an 8–5–1 record in 1965.

== AFL commissioner (1966) ==
By the end of its sixth season in 1965, the American Football League had overcome its initial status of bare-bones survivor to become a significant rival to the NFL. With a television contract with NBC and major stadiums constructed or being built, the AFL could afford to compete on equal terms for players with the NFL. Not all AFL owners sought a merger — Jets owner Sonny Werblin, for example, felt that with brand-new Shea Stadium and the young star Joe Namath at quarterback, his team could compete on equal terms with the crosstown NFL Giants. However, most AFL owners wanted to be a part of the older, better-established NFL, whose owners feared continued escalation of player salaries.

While the AFL owners liked the league's first commissioner, Joe Foss, they had little confidence in his abilities at a time for struggle between the two leagues, and Foss resigned on April 7, 1966. Davis, 36, was voted in as commissioner the following day, and took the job with Valley's agreement, hired as a fighter who would win the war with the NFL. The owners, led by Chiefs owner Lamar Hunt, felt that Davis could put pressure on the NFL and force a favorable settlement. His biographer, Glenn Dickey, notes that Davis was deceived by the owners, "He thought he had been hired to win the war with the NFL. In fact, the owners only wanted to force a peace. They were quietly negotiating a merger while Davis was fighting a war."

According to sportswriter Ken Rappoport in his history of the AFL, "Davis had a plan, and, considering the football genius the man would become, no one should have been surprised that it would work—brilliantly." Davis's target in the war was the NFL's quarterbacks, arranging for AFL teams to sign star players, such as Roman Gabriel of the Rams, who would be free agents after 1966 although that season had not yet begun. Gabriel, with his AFL contract to begin in 1967, received an immediate $100,000 bonus. The signing of 49ers quarterback John Brodie was announced by Davis and the AFL. (Note: The Gabriel and Brodie transactions were undone by the merger agreement. Rappoport, p. 170.) These transactions increased the financial pressure on the NFL's weaker franchises, which faced the prospect of losing their best players in a year, or greatly increasing their labor costs. A merger agreement was announced on June 8 and Davis was greatly displeased with the agreement on two fronts. It required the Jets and Raiders to pay indemnities to the Giants and 49ers for establishing teams within their exclusive territories, and it also put him out of a job: the merger agreement immediately abolished the post of AFL commissioner. Pete Rozelle would continue in his post as NFL commissioner under the merger agreement. Davis had hoped to be named commissioner if any merger was reached; the result increased what already had become a dislike of Rozelle.

Davis resigned as commissioner on July 25, 1966. AFL owners wanted Davis to continue serving as AFL President. AFL owners had explicitly agreed that the office of AFL President would be subservient to that of the NFL Commissioner, and Davis flatly refused to consider serving as a subordinate to Rozelle. Eventually, Milt Woodard (who was assistant commissioner under Foss) agreed to serve as President of the AFL.

== Back with the Raiders (1966–2011) ==
After resigning as AFL commissioner, Davis formed a holding company, A.D. Football, Inc., and returned to the Oakland Raiders. He paid $18,000 (equivalent to $178,615 in 2025) for a 10 percent stake in the team and became one of three general partners, along with Wayne Valley and Ed McGah. As part of the deal, he was also named head of football operations. Despite his small stake, Davis had effectively resumed his old role as operating head of the franchise, and would remain so for the next 45 years. Valley and McGah largely left the Raiders in Davis's hands.

In 1972, while managing general partner Valley was attending the 1972 Summer Olympics in Munich, Davis drafted a revised partnership agreement that made him the new managing general partner with near-absolute control over team operations. McGah signed the agreement. Since two of the team's three general partners had voted in favor of the agreement, it was binding under California partnership law at the time. Valley sued to overturn the agreement once he returned to the country but was unsuccessful. Valley sold his interest in 1976 and from that point none of the other partners played any role in the team's operations despite the fact that Davis did not acquire a majority interest in the Raiders until 2005, when he bought the shares held by McGah's family (McGah died in 1983). At the time of his death, Davis owned about 67% of the team.

In addition to serving as owner, Davis effectively served as his own general manager until his death — longer than any football operations chief in the league at the time. When he died, he was one of three NFL owners who had the title or powers of general manager, the others being Jerry Jones of the Dallas Cowboys and Mike Brown of the Cincinnati Bengals. Davis was long recognized as one of the most hands-on owners in professional sports and reportedly had more authority over day-to-day operations than any other owner in the league.

Davis was known throughout the league as a maverick and dressed the part. By the time he took complete control of the Raiders, he had assumed his classic image—slicked-back hair in a 1950s-style ducktail, dark sunglasses, white tracksuits and Brooklyn-tinged speech ("the Raiduhs"). Their bully image of the 1970s and 1980s are attributed directly to Davis, who has often said he'd rather be feared than respected. Slogans such as "Just Win, Baby," "Pride and Poise" and "Commitment to Excellence" are Davis trademarks. "Don't be afraid of failure," said Davis. "Don't worry about mistakes. Just win."

Although he became successful on the business side of football, Davis didn't lose touch with game strategy and talent evaluation. He has boasted that he can watch somebody for 10 seconds and tell if he's a player. "I don't think the idea is to be totally human," Davis said. "I don't want to look like the other owners. It's establishment. I've always been closer to the players." "If horse racing were Al's business, he would love those yearling auctions where they walk each horse out for everybody to see them," former Raiders coach John Madden wrote in his autobiography. "Al would pick more stakes winners than anybody else. Al might even find a way to talk to the horse."

With Davis in control, the Raiders became one of the most successful teams in all of professional sports. From 1967 to 1985, they won one AFL championship (1967), three Super Bowls: 1976 (XI), 1980 (XV) and 1983 (XVIII) and made 15 playoff appearances (including 11 AFL / AFC Championship Game appearances). Although the Raiders later fell on harder times, going 37–91 from 2003 to 2010, they are one of only seven teams to play in the Super Bowl in four different decades, the others being the Pittsburgh Steelers, New England Patriots, New York Giants, Denver Broncos, St. Louis/Los Angeles Rams and San Francisco 49ers.

In 1992, Davis was inducted into the Pro Football Hall of Fame as a Team and League Administrator and was presented by John Madden. Davis was chosen by a record nine Pro Football Hall of Fame inductees to present them at the Canton, Ohio ceremony: Lance Alworth, Jim Otto, George Blanda, Willie Brown, Gene Upshaw, Fred Biletnikoff, Art Shell, Ted Hendricks and Madden.

In 2007, Davis sold a minority stake in the Raiders for $150 million and said that he would not retire until he won two more Super Bowls or died.

Davis's generosity was legendary when it came to helping former players in need, although he routinely did so without fanfare. His philosophy was: once a Raider, always a Raider.

=== Legal battles ===
Davis was long considered one of the most controversial owners in the NFL and was involved in multiple lawsuits.

Prior to the 1980 season, Davis attempted unsuccessfully to have improvements made to the Oakland Coliseum, specifically the addition of luxury boxes. On March 1, 1980, he signed a memorandum of agreement to move the Raiders from Oakland to Los Angeles. The move, which required three-fourths approval by league owners, was defeated 22–0 (with five owners abstaining). When Davis tried to move the team anyway, he was blocked by an injunction. In response, the Raiders not only became an active partner in an antitrust lawsuit filed by the Los Angeles Memorial Coliseum (who had recently lost the Los Angeles Rams to Anaheim), but filed an antitrust lawsuit of their own. After the first case was declared a mistrial, in May 1982 a second jury ruled in favor of Davis and the Los Angeles Coliseum, clearing the way for the move. The Raiders finally relocated to Los Angeles for the 1982 season, playing their home games at the Los Angeles Memorial Coliseum.

One major factor for Davis in moving to the Los Angeles Coliseum—despite its flaws as a football stadium—was his assumption that the NFL would eventually approve pay-per-view telecasts for its games; such a move would potentially have given the Raiders a virtual television monopoly in Los Angeles, the nation's second-largest television market. Davis also counted on being able to persuade the Los Angeles Coliseum Commission to renovate the facility, particularly by installing scores of luxury boxes.

In 1995, after being unable to secure a new stadium in the Los Angeles area and when a proposed move to Sacramento that involved Davis taking ownership of the Sacramento Kings fell apart, Davis moved the team back to Oakland then sued the NFL, claiming the league sabotaged the team's effort to build a stadium at Hollywood Park in Inglewood by not doing enough to help the team move from the antiquated Los Angeles Memorial Coliseum to a new stadium complete with luxury suites. The NFL won a 9-3 verdict in 2001, but Los Angeles County Superior Court Judge Richard Hubbell ordered a new trial amid accusations that one juror was biased against the team and Davis, and that another juror committed misconduct. A state appeals court overturned that decision, and the California Supreme Court unanimously ruled the verdict against the Raiders stands.

In the mid-1990s, Davis sued the NFL on behalf of the Raiders, claiming the Raiders had exclusive rights to the Los Angeles market, even though the Raiders were in Oakland. Davis and the Raiders lost the lawsuit.

In 2007, NFL Films chose the feud between Davis and the NFL/Pete Rozelle as their No. 1 greatest feud in NFL history on the NFL Network's Top Ten Feuds, citing almost a half-century of animosity between Davis and the league. Some believe that the root of Davis's animosity towards the NFL and his former co-owners in the AFL was the surreptitious way they pushed the AFL–NFL merger behind his back.

The feud was most recently chronicled in Al Davis vs. the NFL, a documentary on the feud between Davis and Rozelle first broadcast by ESPN on February 4, 2021, as part of its 30 for 30 series. The film's narrative structure uses reconstructions of Davis and Rozelle to "tell" its story, using deepfake technology and extensive content from the NFL Films archives.

=== Trading Stabler ===
In the 1980 offseason, star quarterback Ken Stabler attempted to renegotiate his contract with the Raiders. A veteran “gunslinger”, Stabler had won the Raiders' only title until then and had been a mainstay since his 1968 signing with the team as a protégé of Daryle Lamonica. Davis angered much of the Raiders community by dealing him to the Houston Oilers for quarterback Dan Pastorini, a trade many regarded as selfishly seeking revenge while strengthening the team's top AFC rival. Pastorini was injured in week 5 and the starting role fell to his backup, Jim Plunkett. The former Heisman Trophy-winning but little-achieved professional led the Raiders to a victory in Super Bowl XV.

=== Marcus Allen benching ===
Marcus Allen, the MVP in the Raiders' Super Bowl XVIII victory, was ordered benched by Davis for two years following a contract dispute. Davis only commented, "He was a cancer on the team." Allen said that Davis "told me he was going to get me." He added that "I think he's tried to ruin the later part of my career. He's trying to stop me from going to the Hall of Fame. They don't want me to play." Davis called Allen's charges "fraudulent" and then-Raiders coach Art Shell said only he decided who plays. The Raiders released Allen in 1992.

=== Davis deals Gruden ===
On February 18, 2002, Davis dealt his head coach Jon Gruden to the Tampa Bay Buccaneers in exchange for Tampa Bay's 2002 and 2003 first-round draft picks, 2002 and 2004 second-round draft picks, and $8 million in cash. His replacement, Bill Callahan, led Oakland to an 11–5 record and their third consecutive division championship. The Raiders reached Super Bowl XXXVII, where they faced Gruden, who led Tampa Bay to its first Super Bowl berth. The Buccaneers won in a 48–21 blowout, in a matchup that was termed the "Gruden Bowl". Seventeen years later, Gruden returned to the Raiders as head coach in 2018 after seven years with the Buccaneers and nine years with ESPN, although he resigned in 2021 as a result of emails leaked of Gruden making misogynistic, homophobic, and racist comments.

=== Losing years ===
Although it was not apparent at the time, the Raiders' loss in Super Bowl XXXVII would be Davis's last hurrah. The Raiders would start to struggle and suffer seven consecutive losing seasons from 2003 to 2009, the longest drought in franchise history. This included double-digit loss record seasons in seven consecutive years from 2003 to 2009. The team cycled through multiple head coaches. Their 2007 first overall draft pick, quarterback JaMarcus Russell, was called "the biggest draft flop in NFL history" by FoxSports.com. Davis was largely blamed, and his motto of "Just win, baby!" was mocked by many. Russell was released by the Raiders in May 2010 and never played another down in the NFL.

The 2011 Raiders' record was 2–2 at Davis's death. The day after his death, the Raiders defeated the Houston Texans 25–20 on a final play interception by safety Michael Huff in the end zone. The Raiders finished the season with a record of 8–8 and missed the playoffs, after starting the season 7–4.

=== Civil rights and diversity ===
Davis breached several civil rights and diversity barriers during his career with the Raiders. In 1963, the Raiders were scheduled to play a preseason game in Mobile, Alabama. In protest of Alabama's segregation laws, Davis refused to allow the game to be played there and demanded the game be moved to Oakland. He also refused to allow the players to travel to cities to play games where the black and white players would have to stay in separate hotels.

Davis was the first NFL owner to hire an African American head coach, Art Shell, and a female chief executive, Amy Trask. He also hired Tom Flores, the first Latino head coach in the league. (Note: Tom Fears of the New Orleans Saints in 1967 was the first Latino head coach in the NFL. Flores, who started coaching in 1979, is listed in some sources as being the first.)

== Head coaching record ==
Team	Year					
Team	Year	Won	Lost	Ties	Win %	Finish
OAK	1963	10	4	0	.714	2nd in AFL Western
OAK	1964	5	7	2	.417	3rd in AFL Western
OAK	1965	8	5	1	.615	2nd in AFL Western
Total		23	16	3	.583	

== Death ==
Davis died, aged 82, in his suite at the Hilton Hotel Oakland Airport at 2:45 a.m. PDT on October 8, 2011 in Oakland, California. Nine days later, a private service and funeral was held for Davis, who was interred at Chapel of the Chimes. In the days following the funeral, The Associated Press obtained information pertaining to Davis's death. The death certificate, issued by Alameda County, disclosed Davis had died from "an abnormal heart rhythm, congestive heart failure and a heart muscle disease". Davis had previously undergone heart surgery in 1996. Davis was also afflicted with Merkel-cell carcinoma, a rare skin cancer, and had undergone throat surgery in the days preceding his death.

There was an outpouring of support and grief in the wake of Davis's death. John Madden, who had remained close to Davis since their first meeting in 1966, lamented, "You don't replace a guy like that. No way. No damn way. You look at the things he's done that no one ever did before, being a scout, assistant coach, head coach, general manager, commissioner and owner." The Sunday following his death, the Oakland Raiders adorned their helmets with a sticker which read "Al" in Davis's memory. A league-wide moment of silence was also observed. Despite the widespread remembrance of his accomplishments, Davis's position as a controversial figure lives on as part of his legacy. Sportswriter Rick Reilly was particularly adamant that the questionable personnel decisions Davis made later in his career and his arrogant, brash personality should not be forgotten amidst sportswriters' praise of him as an innovative owner.

Davis was survived by his wife, Carol and their only child, Mark, a graduate of California State University, Chico. Mark assumed his father's old title of managing general partner of the Raiders and with his mother owns the majority of the team. Both Mark and Carol represent the Raiders in owners' meetings. Carol suffered a serious heart attack in 1979 and was hospitalized for three weeks but was able to make a complete recovery.

Al Davis's mother Rose had lived to age 103. She died in 2001, having outlived her husband Lou by 40 years.

=== The "11th man" ===
The day after Davis's death, the Raiders played the Houston Texans. Oakland was leading the game 25–20 late in the fourth quarter. On the final play of the game, Raider free safety Michael Huff intercepted Texan quarterback Matt Schaub in the end zone to preserve the victory. The Raiders had only 10 defensive players on the field for the play. The play was referred to as the "Divine Interception" with media speculating that Davis was the 11th player on the field in spirit. Raiders coach Hue Jackson said Al Davis "had his hand on that ball." Jackson was highly emotional in victory as well as Davis's son Mark Davis. Jackson said, "One thing coach [Davis] always taught me was he said: 'Hue, don't believe in plays. Believe in players and eventually the players will make plays for you.' And that's what I did. I could just hear him saying that to me the whole time. Believe in your players and not the plays." "We know he's looking down on us right now," Hue said. "This win is for him. I appreciate everything he's done for this organization. He's never gone in our eyes. We'll never let him go. He's with us."

== Al Davis memorial torch ==
After Davis's death, Mark Davis and the Raiders created the Al Davis memorial torch.

There are currently two such torches: the original torch is a gas-operated torch that was brought out on game days at the Oakland Coliseum and was lit by Raiders alumni, celebrities and fans prior to each Raider home game. That individual would then also sign the back or one of the side panels of the torch.

When the team relocated to Las Vegas in 2020, the torch from the Coliseum was moved to and placed in front of the team's new headquarters in Henderson, Nevada, with the player-signed side and back panels being put on display at Allegiant Stadium, where an 85-foot-tall (26 m) torch (that rises above the main concourse) was built. Unlike the original from Oakland, there is no real flame; a towering LED image is used instead. The Allegiant Stadium torch is the largest 3D printed object in the world.

== Accolades ==
In 2003, Davis was inducted into the Southern California Jewish Sports Hall of Fame.

== See also ==
- Oakland Raiders
- Los Angeles Raiders

== Bibliography ==
- Dickey, Glenn (1991). Just Win, Baby: Al Davis & His Raiders. New York: Harcourt Brace Jovanovich. ISBN 978-0-15-146580-4.
- Ribowsky, Mark (1991). Slick: The Silver and Black Life of Al Davis. New York: Macmillan Publishing Company. ISBN 978-0-02-602500-3.
- Simmons, Ira (1990). Black Knight: Al Davis and His Raiders. Rocklin, California: Prima Publishing. ISBN 978-1-55958-055-7.
- Miller, Jeff (2003). Going Long: The Wild Ten-Year Saga of the Renegade American Football League In the Words of Those Who Lived It. McGraw-Hill. ISBN 0-07-141849-0.
- Olderman, Murray (2012). Just Win, Baby: The Al Davis Story. Illinois: Triumph Books. ISBN 978-1-60078-764-5.
- Davis, Jeff (2008). Rozelle, Czar of the NFL. New York: McGraw Hill. ISBN 978-0-07-147166-4.
- Rappoport, Ken (2010). The Little League that Could: A History of the American Football League. Lanham, Maryland: Taylor Trade Publishing. ISBN 978-1-58979-463-4.
- Richmond, Peter (2010). Badasses: The Legend of Snake, Foo, Dr. Death, and John Madden's Oakland Raiders. New York: HarperCollins. ISBN 978-0-06-183430-1.
