= 2013 Oakland Raiders season =

54th season in franchise history

- Owner: Mark Davis
- General manager: Reggie McKenzie
- Head coach: Dennis Allen
- Home stadium: O.co Coliseum

Results
- Record: 4–12
- Division place: 4th AFC West
- Playoffs: Did not qualify
- Pro Bowlers: Marcel Reece, FB

Uniform
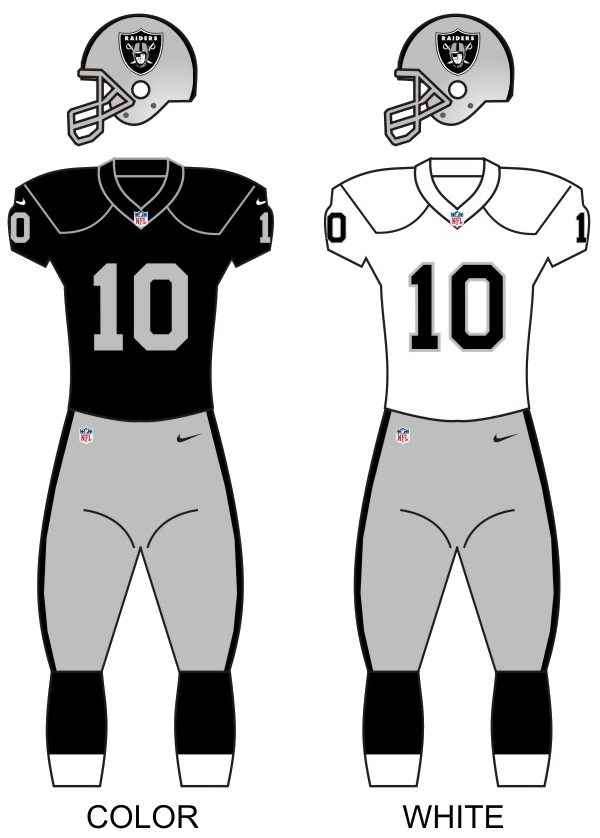

The 2013 season was the Oakland Raiders' 44th in the National Football League (NFL), their 54th overall and their second under head coach Dennis Allen. With a 4–12 record, the Raiders secured their eleventh consecutive non-winning season, and missed the playoffs for an eleventh consecutive season. The Raiders entered the season with a new quarterback in Terrelle Pryor. Pryor started off the season in impressive fashion, with the team almost pulling off the upset in Week 1 against the Indianapolis Colts, and defeating the Jacksonville Jaguars in Week 2. The team and Pryor eventually cooled down, resulting in Pryor being benched for Matt McGloin in the game against the Houston Texans. Before this game, history was made in the game against the Philadelphia Eagles when Eagles quarterback Nick Foles threw seven touchdown passes, the most passing touchdowns the Raiders had ever allowed in its history. Prior to the season starting, the Raiders brought back defensive back Charles Woodson, who spent the last 7 years with the Green Bay Packers.

== 2013 draft class ==
Round	Selection	Player	Position	College
1	12^{[a]}	D. J. Hayden	Cornerback	Houston
2^{[b]}	42^{[a]}	Menelik Watson	Offensive tackle	Florida State
3	66	Sio Moore	Linebacker	UConn
4	112^{[c]}	Tyler Wilson	Quarterback	Arkansas
6	172	Nick Kasa	Tight end	Colorado
6	181^{[c]}	Latavius Murray	Running back	Central Florida
6	184^{[d]}	Mychal Rivera	Tight end	Tennessee
6	205^{[e]}	Stacy McGee	Defensive tackle	Oklahoma
7	209	Brice Butler	Wide receiver	San Diego State
7	233^{[d]}	David Bass	Defensive end	Missouri Western

Notes

^{^[a]} The Raiders traded their first-round selection (No. 3 overall) to the Miami Dolphins in exchange for the Dolphins' first- (No. 12 overall) and second- (No. 42 overall) round selections.
^{^[b]} The Raiders traded their original second-round selection (No. 37 overall) to the Cincinnati Bengals in exchange for quarterback Carson Palmer.
^{^[c]} The Raiders traded their fourth-round selection (No. 100 overall) to the Tampa Bay Buccaneers in exchange for the Buccaneers' fourth- (No. 112 overall) and sixth- (No. 181) round selections.
^{^[d]} The Raiders acquired an additional sixth-round selection — No. 176 overall, along with a conditional 2014 selection in a trade that sent quarterback Carson Palmer and one of their seventh-round selections (No. 219 overall; previously acquired in a trade that sent wide receiver Louis Murphy to the Carolina Panthers) to the Arizona Cardinals. The Raiders later traded the No. 176 selection to the Houston Texans in exchange for the Texans' sixth (No. 184 overall) and seventh- (No. 233 overall) round selections.
^{^[e]} Compensatory selection.

The Raiders did not have a selection in the fifth round, as they traded their fifth-round selection (No. 138 overall) to the Seattle Seahawks in exchange for linebacker Aaron Curry.

== Staff ==
2013 Oakland Raiders staff
Front office: Owner – Mark Davis; General manager – Reggie McKenzie; Director of football administration – Tom Delaney; Director of player personnel – Joey Clinkscales; Director of college scouting – Shaun Herock; Head coaches: Head coach – Dennis Allen; Assistant head coach/offensive line – Tony Sparano; Offensive coaches: Offensive coordinator – Greg Olson; Quarterbacks – John DeFilippo; Running backs – Kelly Skipper; Wide receivers – Ted Gilmore; Tight ends – Mark Hutson; Senior offensive assistant – Al Saunders; Offensive assistant – Nick Holz; Offensive quality control – Justin Griffith	Defensive coaches: Defensive coordinator – Jason Tarver; Defensive line – Terrell Williams; Linebackers – Bob Sanders; Defensive backs – Clayton Lopez; Defensive backs – Johnnie Lynn; Defensive assistant – Travis Smith; Defensive quality control – Eric Sanders; Special teams coaches: Special teams coordinator – Bobby April; Assistant special teams – Keith Burns; Strength and conditioning: Strength and conditioning – Al Miller; Assistant strength and conditioning – John Grieco

== Final roster ==
2013 Oakland Raiders roster
Quarterbacks (QB): 14 Matt McGloin; 2 Terrelle Pryor; Running backs (RB): 27 Rashad Jennings; 22 Taiwan Jones; 20 Darren McFadden; 49 Jamize Olawale; 45 Marcel Reece FB; 32 Jeremy Stewart; Wide receivers (WR): 19 Brice Butler; 12 Jacoby Ford; 18 Andre Holmes; 10 Greg Jenkins; 17 Denarius Moore; 80 Rod Streater; Tight ends (TE): 88 Nick Kasa; 85 Jeron Mastrud; 81 Mychal Rivera	Offensive linemen (OL): 69 Khalif Barnes G/T; 65 Mike Brisiel G; 64 Andre Gurode C/G; 63 Lamar Mady G; 73 Matt McCants T; 76 Lucas Nix G; 79 Tony Pashos T; 68 Jared Veldheer T; 71 Menelik Watson T; 61 Stefen Wisniewski C; Defensive linemen (DL): 91 Jack Crawford DE; 99 Lamarr Houston DE; 93 Jason Hunter DE; 77 Ricky Lumpkin DT; 92 Stacy McGee DT; 97 Daniel Muir DT; 62 Diamond Mendez DT; 58 Ryan Robinson DE; 90 Pat Sims DT; 98 Vance Walker DT/DE	Linebackers (LB): 95 Kaelin Burnett OLB; 94 Kevin Burnett OLB; 56 Miles Burris OLB; 54 Marshall McFadden MLB; 55 Sio Moore OLB; 53 Nick Roach MLB; Defensive backs (DB): 28 Phillip Adams CB; 37 Chance Casey CB; 35 Chimdi Chekwa CB; 21 Mike Jenkins CB; 42 Shelton Johnson FS; 23 Tracy Porter CB; 29 Brandian Ross SS; 24 Charles Woodson FS; Special teams (ST): 59 Jon Condo LS; 11 Sebastian Janikowski K; 7 Marquette King P	Practice squad: 36 Johnny Adams CB; 72 Jack Cornell G/T; 16 Jared Green WR; 47 Eric Harper LB; 89 Brian Leonhardt TE; 38 Kyle McCarthy S; 96 Chris McCoy LB; Reserve: 86 David Ausberry TE (IR); 70 Tony Bergstrom G/T (IR); 33 Tyvon Branch SS (IR); 84 Juron Criner WR (IR); 25 D. J. Hayden CB (IR); 50 Kaluka Maiava OLB (IR); 34 Latavius Murray RB (IR); 26 Usama Young FS (IR); Rookies in italics 53 active, 8 reserve, 7 practice squad

== Schedule ==
=== Preseason ===
Week	Date	Opponent	Result	Record	Venue	NFL.com recap
1	August 9	Dallas Cowboys	**W** 19–17	1–0	O.co Coliseum	Recap
2	August 16	at New Orleans Saints	**L** 20–28	1–1	Mercedes-Benz Superdome	Recap
3	August 23	Chicago Bears	**L** 26–34	1–2	O.co Coliseum	Recap
4	August 29	at Seattle Seahawks	**L** 6–22	1–3	CenturyLink Field	Recap

=== Regular season ===
Week	Date	Opponent	Result	Record	Venue	NFL.com recap
1	September 8	at Indianapolis Colts	**L** 17–21	0–1	Lucas Oil Stadium	Recap
2	September 15	Jacksonville Jaguars	**W** 19–9	1–1	O.co Coliseum	Recap
3	September 23	at **Denver Broncos**	**L** 21–37	1–2	Sports Authority Field at Mile High	Recap
4	September 29	Washington Redskins	**L** 14–24	1–3	O.co Coliseum	Recap
5	October 6	**San Diego Chargers**	**W** 27–17	2–3	O.co Coliseum	Recap
6	October 13	at **Kansas City Chiefs**	**L** 7–24	2–4	Arrowhead Stadium	Recap
7	Bye					
8	October 27	Pittsburgh Steelers	**W** 21–18	3–4	O.co Coliseum	Recap
9	November 3	Philadelphia Eagles	**L** 20–49	3–5	O.co Coliseum	Recap
10	November 10	at New York Giants	**L** 20–24	3–6	MetLife Stadium	Recap
11	November 17	at Houston Texans	**W** 28–23	4–6	Reliant Stadium	Recap
12	November 24	Tennessee Titans	**L** 19–23	4–7	O.co Coliseum	Recap
13	November 28	at Dallas Cowboys	**L** 24–31	4–8	AT&T Stadium	Recap
14	December 8	at New York Jets	**L** 27–37	4–9	MetLife Stadium	Recap
15	December 15	**Kansas City Chiefs**	**L** 31–56	4–10	O.co Coliseum	Recap
16	December 22	at **San Diego Chargers**	**L** 13–26	4–11	Qualcomm Stadium	Recap
17	December 29	**Denver Broncos**	**L** 14–34	4–12	O.co Coliseum	Recap

Note: Intra-division opponents are in bold text.

=== Game summaries ===
==== Week 1: at Indianapolis Colts ====
Week One: Oakland Raiders at Indianapolis Colts – Game summary

Quarter	1	2	3	4	Total
Raiders	0	7	3	7	**17**
**Colts**	7	7	0	7	**21**

at Lucas Oil Stadium, Indianapolis, Indiana

- Date: September 8
- Game time: 1:00 p.m. EDT/10:00 a.m. PDT
- Game weather: Played indoors (retractable roof closed)
- Game attendance: 65,412
- Referee: Bill Vinovich
- TV announcers (CBS): Marv Albert and Rich Gannon
- Recap, Game book

Game information

**First quarter**

- IND – Reggie Wayne 12-yard pass from Andrew Luck (Adam Vinatieri kick), 2:47. Colts 7–0. **Drive: 10 plays, 89 yards, 6:17.**

**Second quarter**

- IND – Dwayne Allen 20-yard pass from Andrew Luck (Adam Vinatieri kick), 10:47. Colts 14–0. **Drive: 8 plays, 69 yards, 3:30.**
- OAK – Darren McFadden 1-yard run (Sebastian Janikowski kick), 4:53. Colts 14–7. **Drive: 11 plays, 85 yards, 5:54.**

**Third quarter**

- OAK – Sebastian Janikowski 38-yard field goal, 5:42. Colts 14–10. **Drive: 10 plays, 65 yards, 4:41.**

**Fourth quarter**

- OAK – Denarius Moore 5-yard pass from Terrelle Pryor (Sebastian Janikowski kick), 11:09. Raiders 17–14. **Drive: 11 plays, 44 yards, 5:41.**
- IND – Andrew Luck 19-yard run (Adam Vinatieri kick), 5:20. Colts 21–17. **Drive: 11 plays, 80 yards, 5:49.**

**Top passers**

- OAK – Terrelle Pryor – 19/29, 217 yards, TD, 2 INT
- IND – Andrew Luck – 18/23, 178 yards, 2 TD

**Top rushers**

- OAK – Terrelle Pryor – 13 rushes, 112 yards
- IND – Vick Ballard – 13 rushes, 63 yards

**Top receivers**

- OAK – Rod Streater – 5 receptions, 70 yards
- IND – Reggie Wayne – 8 receptions, 96 yards, TD

==== Week 2: vs. Jacksonville Jaguars ====
Week Two: Jacksonville Jaguars at Oakland Raiders – Game summary

Quarter	1	2	3	4	Total
Jaguars	0	3	0	6	**9**
**Raiders**	7	3	3	6	**19**

at O.co Coliseum, Oakland, California

- Date: September 15
- Game time: 1:25 p.m. PDT
- Game weather: 76 °F (24 °C), sunny
- Game attendance: 49,400
- Referee: Walt Anderson
- TV announcers (CBS): Spero Dedes and Steve Tasker
- Recap, Game book

Game information

**First quarter**

- OAK – Marcel Reece 11-yard run (Sebastian Janikowski kick), 10:52. Raiders 7–0. **Drive: 5 plays, 38 yards, 2:45.**

**Second quarter**

- JAX – Josh Scobee 27-yard field goal, 7:45. Raiders 7–3. **Drive: 15 plays, 78 yards, 6:56.**
- OAK – Sebastian Janikowski 31-yard field goal, 0:03. Raiders 10–3. **Drive: 10 plays, 44 yards, 2:47.**

**Third quarter**

- OAK – Sebastian Janikowski 30-yard field goal, 9:18. Raiders 13–3. **Drive: 12 plays, 69 yards, 5:42.**

**Fourth quarter**

- OAK – Sebastian Janikowski 29-yard field goal, 13:49. Raiders 16–3. **Drive: 7 plays, 43 yards, 3:56.**
- OAK – Sebastian Janikowski 29-yard field goal, 6:00. Raiders 19–3. **Drive: 10 plays, 52 yards, 6:23.**
- JAX – Clay Harbor 13-yard pass from Chad Henne (pass failed), 2:53. Raiders 19–9. **Drive: 6 plays, 49 yards, 1:54.**

**Top passers**

- JAX – Chad Henne – 25/38, 241 yards, TD
- OAK – Terrelle Pryor – 15/24, 126 yards

**Top rushers**

- JAX – Maurice Jones-Drew – 10 rushes, 27 yards
- OAK – Darren McFadden – 19 rushes, 129 yards

**Top receivers**

- JAX – Cecil Shorts – 8 receptions, 93 yards
- OAK – Rod Streater – 3 receptions, 42 yards

==== Week 3: at Denver Broncos ====
Week Three: Oakland Raiders at Denver Broncos – Game summary

Quarter	1	2	3	4	Total
Raiders	0	7	7	7	**21**
**Broncos**	10	17	3	7	**37**

at Sports Authority Field at Mile High, Denver, Colorado

- Date: September 23
- Game time: 6:40 p.m. MDT/5:40 p.m. PDT
- Game weather: 64 °F (18 °C), mostly clear
- Game attendance: 76,978
- Referee: Jerome Boger
- TV announcers (ESPN): Mike Tirico, Jon Gruden and Lisa Salters
- Recap, Game book

Game information

**First quarter**

- DEN – Eric Decker 2-yard pass from Peyton Manning (Matt Prater kick), 10:28. Broncos 7–0. **Drive: 8 plays, 55 yards, 3:23.**
- DEN – Matt Prater 53-yard field goal, 0:47. Broncos 10–0. **Drive: 6 plays, 24 yards, 3:42.**

**Second quarter**

- DEN – Wes Welker 12-yard pass from Peyton Manning (Matt Prater kick), 7:27. Broncos 17–0. **Drive: 10 plays, 80 yards, 4:35.**
- OAK – Denarius Moore 73-yard pass from Terrelle Pryor (Sebastian Janikowski kick), 5:57. Broncos 17–7. **Drive: 3 plays, 80 yards, 1:30.**
- DEN – Julius Thomas 13-yard pass from Peyton Manning (Matt Prater kick), 3:40. Broncos 24–7. **Drive: 4 plays, 80 yards, 2:17.**
- DEN – Matt Prater 41-yard field goal, 0:19. Broncos 27–7. **Drive: 7 plays, 38 yards, 1:30.**

**Third quarter**

- DEN – Matt Prater 40-yard field goal, 8:41. Broncos 30–7. **Drive: 13 plays, 55 yards, 6:19.**
- OAK – Marcel Reece 16-yard pass from Darren McFadden (Sebastian Janikowski kick), 0:17. Broncos 30–14. **Drive: 6 plays, 70 yards, 2:26.**

**Fourth quarter**

- DEN – Ronnie Hillman 1-yard run (Matt Prater kick), 11:27. Broncos 37–14. **Drive: 8 plays, 80 yards, 3:50.**
- OAK – Darren McFadden 1-yard run (Sebastian Janikowski kick), 1:15. Broncos 37–21. **Drive: 4 plays, 20 yards, 1:04.**

**Top passers**

- OAK – Terrelle Pryor – 19/28, 281 yards, TD
- DEN – Peyton Manning – 32/37, 374 yards, 3 TD

**Top rushers**

- OAK – Terrelle Pryor – 4 rushes, 36 yards
- DEN – Ronnie Hillman – 9 rushes, 66 yards, TD

**Top receivers**

- OAK – Denarius Moore – 6 receptions, 124 yards, TD
- DEN – Eric Decker – 8 receptions, 133 yards, TD

==== Week 4: vs. Washington Redskins ====
Week Four: Washington Redskins at Oakland Raiders – Game summary

Quarter	1	2	3	4	Total
**Redskins**	0	10	7	7	**24**
Raiders	14	0	0	0	**14**

at O.co Coliseum, Oakland, California

- Date: September 29
- Game time: 1:25 p.m. PDT
- Game weather: 77 °F (25 °C), sunny
- Game attendance: 53,549
- Referee: Bill Leavy
- TV announcers (Fox): Dick Stockton, Ronde Barber and Kris Budden
- Recap, Game book

Game information

**First quarter**

- OAK – Jeremy Stewart blocked punt recovery in end zone (Sebastian Janikowski kick), 10:40. Raiders 7–0.
- OAK – Mychal Rivera 18-yard pass from Matt Flynn (Sebastian Janikowski kick), 3:06. Raiders 14–0. **Drive: 10 plays, 81 yards, 5:21.**

**Second quarter**

- WAS – John Potter 25-yard field goal, 14:21. Raiders 14–3. **Drive: 11 plays, 73 yards, 3:45.**
- WAS – David Amerson 45-yard interception return (John Potter kick), 10:59. Raiders 14–10.

**Third quarter**

- WAS – Pierre Garçon 5-yard pass from Robert Griffin III (John Potter kick), 2:58. Redskins 17–14. **Drive: 8 plays, 58 yards, 3:53.**

**Fourth quarter**

- WAS – Roy Helu 14-yard run (John Potter kick), 6:59. Redskins 24–14. **Drive: 2 plays, 42 yards, 0:55.**

**Top passers**

- WAS – Robert Griffin III – 18/31, 227 yards, TD
- OAK – Matt Flynn – 21/32, 227 yards, TD, INT

**Top rushers**

- WAS – Alfred Morris – 16 rushes, 71 yards
- OAK – Rashad Jennings – 14 rushes, 45 yards

**Top receivers**

- WAS – Pierre Garçon – 6 receptions, 59 yards, TD
- OAK – Rashad Jennings – 8 receptions, 71 yards

==== Week 5: vs. San Diego Chargers ====
Week Five: San Diego Chargers at Oakland Raiders – Game summary

Quarter	1	2	3	4	Total
Chargers	0	0	3	14	**17**
**Raiders**	14	3	7	3	**27**

at O.co Coliseum, Oakland, California

- Date: October 6
- Game time: 8:35 p.m. PDT^{[b]}
- Game weather: 70 °F (21 °C), partly cloudy
- Game attendance: 48,834
- Referee: Jeff Triplette
- TV announcers (NFLN): Ian Eagle and Dan Fouts
- Recap, Game book

This game was moved to an 8:35 p.m. PDT kickoff, and from CBS to NFL Network as a "special edition" of Thursday Night Football, as extended time was required to convert the field back from its baseball configuration due to an Oakland Athletics American League Division Series game the previous night.

==== Week 6: at Kansas City Chiefs ====
Week Six: Oakland Raiders at Kansas City Chiefs – Game summary

Quarter	1	2	3	4	Total
Raiders	0	7	0	0	**7**
**Chiefs**	0	7	7	10	**24**

at Arrowhead Stadium, Kansas City, Missouri

- Date: October 13
- Game time: 12:00 p.m. CDT/10:00 a.m. PDT
- Game weather: 63 °F (17 °C), sunny
- Game attendance: 76,394
- Referee: Mike Carey
- TV announcers (CBS): Spero Dedes and Rich Gannon
- Recap, Game book

==== Week 8: vs. Pittsburgh Steelers ====
Week Eight: Pittsburgh Steelers at Oakland Raiders – Game summary

Quarter	1	2	3	4	Total
Steelers	0	3	0	15	**18**
**Raiders**	14	7	0	0	**21**

at O.co Coliseum, Oakland, California

- Date: October 27
- Game time: 1:05 p.m. PDT
- Game weather: 56 °F (13 °C), overcast skies
- Game attendance: 52,950
- Referee: John Parry
- TV announcers (CBS): Spero Dedes and Rich Gannon
- Recap, Game book

==== Week 9: vs. Philadelphia Eagles ====
Week Nine: Philadelphia Eagles at Oakland Raiders – Game summary

Quarter	1	2	3	4	Total
**Eagles**	7	21	21	0	**49**
Raiders	3	10	0	7	**20**

at O.co Coliseum, Oakland, California

- Date: November 3
- Game time: 1:05 p.m. PST
- Game weather: 62 °F (17 °C), sunny, hazy skies
- Game attendance: 51,751
- Referee: Ed Hochuli
- TV announcers (Fox): Chris Myers, Tim Ryan and Jennifer Hale
- Recap, Game book

==== Week 10: at New York Giants ====
Week Ten: Oakland Raiders at New York Giants – Game summary

Quarter	1	2	3	4	Total
Raiders	10	7	3	0	**20**
**Giants**	7	7	7	3	**24**

at MetLife Stadium, East Rutherford, New Jersey

- Date: November 10
- Game time: 1:00 p.m. EST/10:00 a.m. PST
- Game weather: 49 °F (9 °C), cloudy
- Game attendance: 80,366
- Referee: Pete Morelli
- TV announcers (CBS): Ian Eagle and Dan Fouts
- Recap, Game book

==== Week 11: at Houston Texans ====
Week Eleven: Oakland Raiders at Houston Texans – Game summary

Quarter	1	2	3	4	Total
**Raiders**	14	0	14	0	**28**
Texans	0	17	0	6	**23**

at Reliant Stadium, Houston, Texas

- Date: November 17
- Game time: 12:00 p.m. CST/10:00 a.m. PST
- Game weather: Played indoors (retractable roof closed)
- Game attendance: 71,726
- Referee: Ron Winter
- TV announcers (CBS): Kevin Harlan and Solomon Wilcots
- Recap, Game book

==== Week 12: vs. Tennessee Titans ====
Week Twelve: Tennessee Titans at Oakland Raiders – Game summary

Quarter	1	2	3	4	Total
**Titans**	3	3	7	10	**23**
Raiders	3	6	3	7	**19**

at O.co Coliseum, Oakland, California

- Date: November 24
- Game time: 1:05 p.m. PST
- Game weather: 58 °F (14 °C), sunny
- Game attendance: 46,001
- Referee: Carl Cheffers
- TV announcers (CBS): Marv Albert and Rich Gannon
- Recap, Game book

==== Week 13: at Dallas Cowboys ====
Thanksgiving Day game

Week Thirteen: Oakland Raiders at Dallas Cowboys – Game summary

Quarter	1	2	3	4	Total
Raiders	7	14	0	3	**24**
**Cowboys**	7	7	7	10	**31**

at AT&T Stadium, Arlington, Texas

- Date: November 28
- Game time: 3:30 p.m. CST/1:30 p.m. PST
- Game weather: Played indoors (retractable roof closed)
- Game attendance: 87,572
- Referee: Scott Green
- TV announcers (CBS): Jim Nantz and Phil Simms
- Recap, Game book

This was the Raiders' final Thanksgiving appearance when they were based in Oakland.

==== Week 14: at New York Jets ====
Week Fourteen: Oakland Raiders at New York Jets – Game summary

Quarter	1	2	3	4	Total
Raiders	0	3	14	10	**27**
**Jets**	10	10	10	7	**37**

at MetLife Stadium, East Rutherford, New Jersey

- Date: December 8
- Game time: 1:00 p.m. EST/10:00 a.m. PST
- Game weather: 33 °F (1 °C), cloudy
- Game attendance: 76,957
- Referee: Gene Steratore
- TV announcers (CBS): Marv Albert and Rich Gannon
- Recap, Game book

==== Week 15: vs. Kansas City Chiefs ====
Week Fifteen: Kansas City Chiefs at Oakland Raiders – Game summary

Quarter	1	2	3	4	Total
**Chiefs**	21	14	14	7	**56**
Raiders	3	14	14	0	**31**

at O.co Coliseum, Oakland, California

- Date: December 15
- Game time: 1:05 p.m. PST
- Game weather: 64 °F (18 °C), sunny
- Game attendance: 49,571
- Referee: Clete Blakeman
- TV announcers (CBS): Ian Eagle and Dan Fouts
- Recap, Game book

==== Week 16: at San Diego Chargers ====
Week Sixteen: Oakland Raiders at San Diego Chargers – Game summary

Quarter	1	2	3	4	Total
Raiders	0	10	0	3	**13**
**Chargers**	3	7	10	6	**26**

at Qualcomm Stadium, San Diego, California

- Date: December 22
- Game time: 1:25 p.m. PST
- Game weather: 67 °F (19 °C), sunny
- Game attendance: 65,675
- Referee: Walt Anderson
- TV announcers (CBS): Bill Macatee and Steve Tasker
- Recap, Game book

==== Week 17: vs. Denver Broncos ====
Week Seventeen: Denver Broncos at Oakland Raiders – Game summary

Quarter	1	2	3	4	Total
**Broncos**	14	17	0	3	**34**
Raiders	0	0	0	14	**14**

at O.co Coliseum, Oakland, California

- Date: December 29
- Game time: 1:25 p.m. PST
- Game weather: 70 °F (21 °C), sunny
- Game attendance: 51,500
- Referee: Ron Winter
- TV announcers (CBS): Kevin Harlan and Solomon Wilcots
- Recap, Game book

Game information

**First quarter**

- DEN – Eric Decker 3-yard pass from Peyton Manning (Matt Prater kick), 7:05. Broncos 7–0 **Drive: 12 plays, 71 yards, 5:54.**
- DEN – Knowshon Moreno 7-yard pass from Peyton Manning (Matt Prater kick), 5:39. Broncos 14–0. **Drive: 4 plays, 21 yards, 1:14.**

**Second quarter**

- DEN – Matt Prater 34-yard field goal, 12:37. Broncos 17–0. **Drive: 11 plays, 49 yards, 4:48.**
- DEN – Demaryius Thomas 63-yard pass from Peyton Manning (Matt Prater kick), 5:37. Broncos 24–0. **Drive: 6 plays, 80 yards, 2:39.**
- DEN – DeMaryius Thomas 5-yard pass from Peyton Manning (Matt Prater kick), 0:13. Broncos 31–0. **Drive: 10 plays, 89 yards, 3:13.**

**Third quarter**

- No scoring plays.

**Fourth quarter**

- DEN – Matt Prater 54-yard field goal, 6:36. Broncos 34–0. **Drive: 7 plays, 24 yards, 2:57.**
- OAK – Rod Streater 14-yard pass from Terrelle Pryor (Sebastian Janikowski kick), 4:24. Broncos 34–7. **Drive: 8 plays, 80 yards, 2:12.**
- OAK – Nick Kasa 9-yard pass from Terrelle Pryor (Sebastian Janikowski kick), 0:37. Broncos 34–14. **Drive: 9 plays, 75 yards, 2:36.**

**Top passers**

- DEN – Peyton Manning – 25/28, 266 yards, 4 TD
- OAK – Terrelle Pryor – 21/38, 207 yards, 2 TD

**Top rushers**

- DEN – Montee Ball – 10 rushes, 72 yards
- OAK – Terrelle Pryor – 9 rushes, 49 yards

**Top receivers**

- DEN – DeMaryius Thomas – 6 receptions, 113 yards, 2 TD
- OAK – Denarius Moore – 4 receptions, 63 yards

== Standings ==
=== Division ===
AFC West
	W	L	T	PCT	DIV	CONF	PF	PA	STK
^{(1)} Denver Broncos	13	3	0	.813	5–1	9–3	606	399	W2
^{(5)} Kansas City Chiefs	11	5	0	.688	2–4	7–5	430	305	L2
^{(6)} San Diego Chargers	9	7	0	.563	4–2	6–6	396	348	W4
Oakland Raiders	4	12	0	.250	1–5	4–8	322	453	L6

=== Conference ===
AFC
#	Team	Division	W	L	T	PCT	DIV	CONF	SOS	SOV	STK
Division winners
1	Denver Broncos	West	13	3	0	.813	5–1	9–3	.469	.423	W2
2	New England Patriots	East	12	4	0	.750	4–2	9–3	.473	.427	W2
3 (Note: Cincinnati defeated Indianapolis head-to-head (Week 14, 42–28).)	Cincinnati Bengals	North	11	5	0	.688	3–3	8–4	.480	.494	W2
4	Indianapolis Colts	South	11	5	0	.688	6–0	9–3	.484	.449	W3
Wild cards
5	Kansas City Chiefs	West	11	5	0	.688	2–4	7–5	.445	.335	L2
6	San Diego Chargers	West	9	7	0	.563	4–2	6–6	.496	.549	W4
Did not qualify for the postseason
7 (Note: Pittsburgh finished with a better division record than Baltimore.) (Note: Pittsburgh defeated the New York Jets head-to-head (Week 6, 19–6).)	Pittsburgh Steelers	North	8	8	0	.500	4–2	6–6	.469	.441	W3
8 (Note: Baltimore defeated the New York Jets head-to-head (Week 12, 19–3).)	Baltimore Ravens	North	8	8	0	.500	3–3	6–6	.484	.418	L2
9 (Note: The New York Jets finished with a better division record than Miami.)	New York Jets	East	8	8	0	.500	3–3	5–7	.488	.414	W2
10	Miami Dolphins	East	8	8	0	.500	2–4	7–5	.523	.523	L2
11	Tennessee Titans	South	7	9	0	.438	2–4	6–6	.504	.375	W2
12	Buffalo Bills	East	6	10	0	.375	3–3	5–7	.520	.500	L1
13 (Note: Oakland and Jacksonville finished with a better conference record than Cleveland.) (Note: Oakland defeated Jacksonville head-to-head (Week 2, 19–9).)	Oakland Raiders	West	4	12	0	.250	1–5	4–8	.523	.359	L6
14 (Note: Jacksonville defeated Cleveland head-to-head (Week 13, 32–28).)	Jacksonville Jaguars	South	4	12	0	.250	3–3	4–8	.504	.234	L3
15	Cleveland Browns	North	4	12	0	.250	2–4	3–9	.516	.477	L7
16	Houston Texans	South	2	14	0	.125	1–5	2–10	.559	.500	L14
Tiebreakers (Note: When breaking ties for three or more teams under the NFL's rules, they are first broken within divisions, then comparing only the highest ranked remaining team from each division.)
