= 2014 Oakland Raiders season =

55th season in franchise history

- Owner: Mark Davis
- General manager: Reggie McKenzie
- Head coach: Dennis Allen (fired on September 29; 0–4 record); Tony Sparano (interim; 3–9 record)
- Home stadium: O.co Coliseum

Results
- Record: 3–13
- Division place: 4th AFC West
- Playoffs: Did not qualify
- Pro Bowlers: Marcel Reece, FB

Uniform
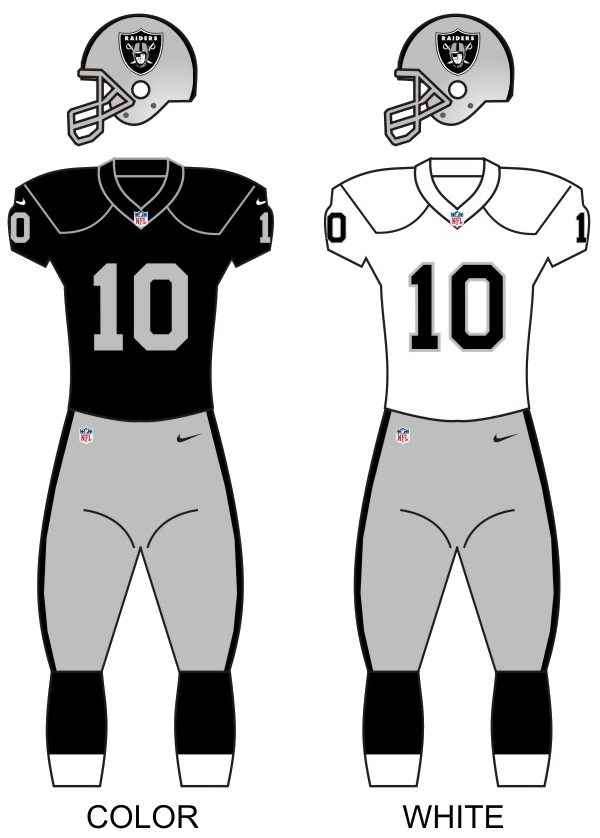

The 2014 season was the Oakland Raiders' 45th in the National Football League (NFL) and their 55th overall. Head coach Dennis Allen was fired on September 29 following an 0–4 start, and compiled an 8–28 record in 2+ seasons in Oakland. Offensive line coach Tony Sparano was named interim head coach on September 30. The Raiders were officially eliminated from the playoffs after their Week 11 loss to the Chargers, therefore becoming the earliest team since the 2004 Dolphins to be eliminated from postseason contention.

After a run of 16 straight losses, including an 0–10 start which had not happened since the 2011 Indianapolis Colts, the Raiders won 24–20 against the Kansas City Chiefs on November 20. The Raiders did not win a single game on the road.

== Draft ==
2014 Oakland Raiders draft
Round	Pick	Player	Position	College	Notes
1	5	Khalil Mack *	LB	Buffalo	
2	36	Derek Carr *	QB	Fresno State	
3	81	Gabe Jackson	OG	Mississippi State	
4	107	Justin Ellis	DT	Louisiana Tech	
4	116	Keith McGill	CB	Utah	
7	219	Travis Carrie	CB	Ohio	
7	235	Shelby Harris	DE	Illinois State	Pick from ARI
7	247	Jonathan Dowling	S	Western Kentucky	Pick from SEA
Made roster † Pro Football Hall of Fame * Made at least one Pro Bowl during career

Draft trades

- The Raiders acquired two additional seventh-round selections — No. 235 as part of a trade that sent quarterback Carson Palmer to the Arizona Cardinals, and No. 247 in a trade that sent quarterback Terrelle Pryor to the Seattle Seahawks.

== Staff ==
2014 Oakland Raiders staff
Front office: Owner – Mark Davis; General manager – Reggie McKenzie; Director of football administration – Tom Delaney; Director of player personnel – Joey Clinkscales; Director of college scouting – Shaun Herock; Head coaches: Head coach – Dennis Allen; Interim head coach/assistant head coach/offensive line – Tony Sparano; Offensive coaches: Offensive coordinator – Greg Olson; Quarterbacks – John DeFilippo; Running backs – Kelly Skipper; Wide receivers – Ted Gilmore; Tight ends – Mark Hutson; Senior offensive assistant – Al Saunders; Offensive assistant – Nick Holz; Offensive quality control – Justin Griffith	Defensive coaches: Defensive coordinator – Jason Tarver; Defensive line – Terrell Williams; Linebackers – Bob Sanders; Defensive backs – Joe Woods; Assistant defensive backs – Marcus Robertson; Defensive assistant – Travis Smith; Defensive quality control – Eric Sanders; Special teams coaches: Special teams coordinator – Bobby April; Assistant special teams – Chris Boniol; Strength and conditioning: Strength and conditioning – John Grieco; Assistant strength and conditioning – Vernon Stephens

== Final roster ==
2014 Oakland Raiders roster
Quarterbacks (QB): 4 Derek Carr; 14 Matt McGloin; 8 Matt Schaub; Running backs (RB): 34 George Atkinson III; 21 Maurice Jones-Drew; 20 Darren McFadden; 28 Latavius Murray; 49 Jamize Olawale FB; 45 Marcel Reece FB; Wide receivers (WR): 19 Vincent Brown; 12 Brice Butler; 18 Andre Holmes; 89 James Jones; 17 Denarius Moore; 85 Kenbrell Thompkins; Tight ends (TE): 81 Mychal Rivera; 83 Scott Simonson	Offensive linemen (OL): 69 Khalif Barnes G/T; 70 Tony Bergstrom G; 67 Kevin Boothe C/G; 77 Austin Howard G; 66 Gabe Jackson G; 73 Matt McCants T; 72 Donald Penn T; 71 Menelik Watson T; 61 Stefen Wisniewski C; Defensive linemen (DL): 96 Denico Autry DE; 78 Justin Ellis DT; 75 Shelby Harris DE; 93 Ricky Lumpkin DT; 95 Benson Mayowa DE; 92 Stacy McGee DT; 90 Pat Sims DT; 94 Antonio Smith DE; 91 Justin Tuck DE; 98 C. J. Wilson DE	Linebackers (LB): 57 Ray-Ray Armstrong OLB; 56 Miles Burris MLB; 54 Bojay Filimoeatu MLB; 50 Spencer Hadley OLB; 52 Khalil Mack OLB; Defensive backs (DB): 38 T. J. Carrie CB; 37 Chance Casey CB; 35 Chimdi Chekwa CB; 36 Ras-I Dowling CB; 25 D. J. Hayden CB; 39 Keith McGill CB; 29 Brandian Ross SS; 31 Neiko Thorpe CB; 24 Charles Woodson FS; Special teams (ST): 59 Jon Condo LS; 11 Sebastian Janikowski K; 7 Marquette King P	Practice squad: 47 Justin Jackson LB; 10 Greg Jenkins WR; 40 Vernon Kearney CB; 65 Dan Kistler T; 63 Lamar Mady G; 6 Michael Palardy K; 15 Seth Roberts WR; 16 Kenny Shaw WR; 43 Jansen Watson CB; 48 Evan Wilson TE; Reserve: 42 Larry Asante SS (IR); 86 David Ausberry TE (IR); 33 Tyvon Branch SS (IR); 23 Tarell Brown CB (IR); 41 Jonathan Dowling FS (IR); 22 Taiwan Jones CB (IR); 88 Nick Kasa TE (IR); 87 Brian Leonhardt TE (IR); 55 Sio Moore OLB (IR); 53 Nick Roach MLB (IR); 27 Carlos Rogers CB (IR); 30 Kory Sheets RB (IR); 80 Rod Streater WR (IR/DFR); 58 LaMarr Woodley DE (IR); 26 Usama Young SS (IR); Rookies in italics 53 active, 15 reserve, 10 practice squad

== Schedule ==
=== Preseason ===
Week	Date	Opponent	Result	Record	Venue	NFL.com recap
1	August 8	at Minnesota Vikings	**L** 6–10	0–1	TCF Bank Stadium	Recap
2	August 15	Detroit Lions	**W** 27–26	1–1	O.co Coliseum	Recap
3	August 22	at Green Bay Packers	**L** 21–31	1–2	Lambeau Field	Recap
4	August 28	Seattle Seahawks	**W** 41–31	2–2	O.co Coliseum	Recap

=== Regular season ===
Week	Date	Opponent	Result	Record	Venue	NFL.com recap
1	September 7	at New York Jets	**L** 14–19	0–1	MetLife Stadium	Recap
2	September 14	Houston Texans	**L** 14–30	0–2	O.co Coliseum	Recap
3	September 21	at New England Patriots	**L** 9–16	0–3	Gillette Stadium	Recap
4	September 28	Miami Dolphins	**L** 14–38	0–4	Wembley Stadium (London, England)	Recap
5	Bye					
6	October 12	**San Diego Chargers**	**L** 28–31	0–5	O.co Coliseum	Recap
7	October 19	Arizona Cardinals	**L** 13–24	0–6	O.co Coliseum	Recap
8	October 26	at Cleveland Browns	**L** 13–23	0–7	FirstEnergy Stadium	Recap
9	November 2	at Seattle Seahawks	**L** 24–30	0–8	CenturyLink Field	Recap
10	November 9	**Denver Broncos**	**L** 17–41	0–9	O.co Coliseum	Recap
11	November 16	at **San Diego Chargers**	**L** 6–13	0–10	Qualcomm Stadium	Recap
12	November 20	**Kansas City Chiefs**	**W** 24–20	1–10	O.co Coliseum	Recap
13	November 30	at St. Louis Rams	**L** 0–52	1–11	Edward Jones Dome	Recap
14	December 7	San Francisco 49ers	**W** 24–13	2–11	O.co Coliseum	Recap
15	December 14	at **Kansas City Chiefs**	**L** 13–31	2–12	Arrowhead Stadium	Recap
16	December 21	Buffalo Bills	**W** 26–24	3–12	O.co Coliseum	Recap
17	December 28	at **Denver Broncos**	**L** 14–47	3–13	Sports Authority Field at Mile High	Recap

Note: Intra-division opponents are in bold text.

=== Game summaries ===
==== Week 1 ====
Team	1	2	3	4	Total
Raiders	7	0	0	7	14
• Jets	3	7	3	6	19

- Date: September 7
- Location: MetLife Stadium
- Game start: 1:00 p.m. EST
- Game attendance: 78,160
- Game weather: Sunny; 76 °F (24 °C)
- Referee: Craig Wrolstad
- TV announcers (CBS): Jim Nantz, Phil Simms, and Tracy Wolfson
- Source: Recap, Gamebook

The Raiders started their season on the road against the Jets. In the first quarter, the Jets grabbed an early lead as Nick Folk kicked a field goal from 45 yards out for a 3–0 lead. The Raiders took the lead later on in the quarter as Derek Carr found Rod Streater on a 12-yard touchdown pass for a 7–3 game. In the 2nd quarter, the Jets retook the lead when Geno Smith found Chris Johnson on a 5-yard touchdown pass for a 10–7 game at halftime. After the break, the Jets returned to work as Folk kicked another field goal from 42 yards out for a 13–7 game for that quarter's only score. In the 4th quarter, they increased their lead as Chris Ivory ran for a 71-yard touchdown (with a failed 2-point conversion) for a 19–7 game. The Raiders scored late in the 4th quarter when Carr found James Jones on a 30-yard touchdown pass for a 19–14 final score.

With the loss, the Raiders started their season 0–1.

==== Week 2 ====
Team	1	2	3	4	Total
• Texans	14	3	10	3	30
Raiders	0	0	0	14	14

- Date: September 14
- Location: O.co Coliseum
- Game start: 4:25 p.m. EST
- Game attendance: 54,063
- Game weather: Sunny; 67 °F (19 °C)
- Referee: Brad Allen
- TV announcers (CBS): Andrew Catalon, Steve Beuerlein, and Steve Tasker
- Source: Recap, Gamebook

After a road loss to the Jets, the Raiders went home to take on the Texans. The Texans would dominate the first half scoring in both the first and second quarters: Ryan Fitzpatrick found J. J. Watt on a 1-yard touchdown pass for a 7–0 lead followed by Arian Foster's 5-yard touchdown run for a 14–0 and lastly Randy Bullock kicking a 33-yard field goal for a 17–0 lead at halftime. After the break, the Texans went back to work in the 3rd quarter as DeAndre Hopkins caught a 12-yard touchdown pass from Fitzpatrick for a 24–0 lead followed up by Bullock kicking a 39-yard field goal for a 27–0 lead. The Raiders finally got on the board in the 4th quarter as Darren McFadden ran for a 1-yard touchdown making it a 27–7 game. The Texans moved ahead as Bullock kicked a 46-yard field goal for a 30–7 game. The Raiders scored the final points of the game as Derek Carr found James Jones on a 9-yard touchdown pass for a 30–14 loss.

With the loss, the Raiders fell to 0–2.

==== Week 3 ====
Team	1	2	3	4	Total
Raiders	3	0	6	0	9
• Patriots	0	10	0	6	16

- Date: September 21
- Location: Gillette Stadium
- Game start: 1:00 p.m. EST
- Game attendance: 68,756
- Game weather: Cloudy; 78 °F (26 °C)
- Referee: Pete Morelli
- TV announcers (CBS): Greg Gumbel, Trent Green, and Evan Washburn
- Source: Recap, Gamebook

After a home loss to the Texans, the Raiders traveled east to take on the Patriots. The Raiders took an early lead when Sebastian Janikowski kicked a 49-yard field goal for a 3–0 game and the only score of the first quarter. The Patriots took the lead in the 2nd quarter when Tom Brady found Rob Gronkowski on a 6-yard touchdown pass for a 7–3 game followed up by Stephen Gostowski kicking a 21-yard field goal for a 10–3 lead at halftime. In the 3rd quarter, the Raiders went back to work as Janikowski nailed 2 field goals from 37 and 47 yards out coming within 4, 10–6 and then within 1, 10–9. However, in the 4th quarter, the Patriots were able to eventually win the game when Gostkowski kicked 2 field goals from 20 and 36 yards out first for a 13–9 and the eventual final score of 16–9. The Raiders were held without a touchdown in a single game for the first time since their 17–6 loss to the Panthers in 2012.

With the loss, the Raiders dropped to 0–3.

==== Week 4 ====
Team	1	2	3	4	Total
• Dolphins	3	21	14	0	38
Raiders	7	0	0	7	14

- Date: September 28
- Location: Wembley Stadium
- Game start: 1:00 p.m. EST
- Game attendance: 83,436
- Game weather: Overcast; 74 °F (23 °C)
- Referee: Bill Leavy
- TV announcers (CBS): Ian Eagle, Dan Fouts, and Jenny Dell
- Source: Recap, Gamebook

The Raiders traveled to London and were considered the home team in the International Series against the Dolphins. In the first quarter, they would score first when Derek Carr found Brian Leonhardt on a 3-yard touchdown pass for a 7–0 lead. Later on, the Dolphins got on the board when Caleb Sturgis kicked a 41-yard field goal to shorten the lead to 7–3. This was the beginning of 35 consecutive points for the team as in the 2nd quarter they took the lead when Ryan Tannehill found Mike Wallace on a 13-yard touchdown pass, Lamar Miller ran for a touchdown from 9 yards out, and then Tannehill found Dion Sims on an 18-yard touchdown pass for leads of 10–7, 17–7, and the eventual halftime score of 24–7. In the 3rd quarter, the Dolphins went back to work as Lamar Miller ran for another touchdown from 1 yard out for a 31–7 lead before Cortland Finnegan returned a fumble 50 yards for a touchdown for a 38–7 lead. In the 4th quarter, the Raiders were able to wrap up the scoring when Backup QB Matt McGloin found Andre Holmes on a 22-yard touchdown pass for the eventual final score of 38–14.

With the loss, the Raiders went 0–4 heading into their bye week.

==== Week 6 ====
Team	1	2	3	4	Total
• Chargers	7	7	7	10	31
Raiders	7	7	7	7	28

- Date: October 12
- Location: O.co Coliseum
- Game start: 4:05 p.m. EST
- Game attendance: 53,329
- Game weather: Sunny; 77 °F (25 °C)
- Referee: Tony Corrente
- TV announcers (CBS): Kevin Harlan, Rich Gannon, and Scott Kaplan
- Source: Recap, Gamebook

After resting up from their bye week, the Raiders returned to the O.co Coliseum for a home game against the Chargers. In the first quarter, they snagged an early 7–0 lead when Derek Carr found Andre Holmes on a 77-yard touchdown pass. Later, the Chargers would tie it up 7–7 when Philip Rivers found Eddie Royal on a 29-yard touchdown pass. In the 2nd quarter, the Chargers took the lead when Rivers found Malcom Floyd on a 5-yard touchdown pass for a 14–7 game. However, the Raiders managed to tie it up before halftime when Carr found James Jones on a 6-yard touchdown pass for a 14–14 game. In the 3rd quarter, the Raiders retook the lead when Carr found Brice Butler on a 47-yard touchdown pass leading 21–14. The Chargers however tied it back up when Rivers found Antonio Gates on a 1-yard touchdown pass for a 21–21 game. In the 4th quarter, the Raiders retook the lead again when Carr found Holmes again on a 6-yard touchdown pass for a 28–21 game. However, the Chargers were able to score 10 points later on in the quarter: First when Nick Novak scored a field goal from 30 yards out to come within 4, 28–24 and then Branden Oliver's 1-yard run for a touchdown for the eventual final score of 31–28.

With the loss, the Raiders dropped to 0–5.

==== Week 7 ====
Team	1	2	3	4	Total
• Cardinals	7	7	7	3	24
Raiders	0	10	3	0	13

- Date: October 19
- Location: O.co Coliseum
- Game start: 4:25 p.m. EST
- Game attendance: 52,101
- Game weather: Sunny; 69 °F (21 °C)
- Referee: Clete Blakeman
- TV announcers (Fox): Dick Stockton, Brady Quinn, and Kristina Pink
- Source: Recap, Gamebook

The Raiders stayed home for a game against the Cardinals. The Cardinals scored first in the first quarter when Carson Palmer found Stepfan Taylor on a 2-yard touchdown pass for a 7–0 lead and the only score of the quarter. They made it 14–0 in the 2nd quarter when Palmer found Michael Floyd on a 33-yard touchdown pass. The Raiders got on the board when Darren McFadden ran for a 1-yard touchdown for a 14–7 lead followed up by Sebastian Janikowski kicking a 29-yard field goal for a 14–10 game at halftime. In the 3rd quarter, the Raiders came within 1 as Janikowski managed to kick a 53-yard field goal for a 14–13 game. The Cards however took control of the game as Taylor ran for a 4-yard touchdown for a 21–13 lead. Finally in the 4th quarter the Cards wrapped up the scoring when Chandler Catanzaro nailed a 41-yard field goal for the eventual final score of 24–13.

With the loss, the Raiders dropped to 0–6 and with the Jaguars' win over the Browns, they became the league's only winless team.

==== Week 8 ====
Team	1	2	3	4	Total
Raiders	0	6	0	7	13
• Browns	6	3	0	14	23

- Date: October 26
- Location: FirstEnergy Stadium
- Game start: 4:25 p.m. EST
- Game attendance: 67,431
- Game weather: Sunny; 55 °F (13 °C)
- Referee: Ron Torbert
- TV announcers (CBS): Spero Dedes and Solomon Wilcots
- Source: Recap, Gamebook

After losses at home, the Raiders traveled to Cleveland to take on the Browns. The Browns scored 9 straight points leading into the 2nd quarter when Billy Cundiff kicked 3 field goals from: 52 (in the 1st quarter), 33, and 26 yards out (in the 2nd quarter) for leads of 3–0, 6–0, and 9–0. The Raiders got on the board when Sebastian Janikowski kicked 2 field goals before halftime from 46 and 38 yards out for a 9–3 and then 9–6 game at halftime. After a scoreless 3rd quarter, the Browns got back to work in the 4th when Brian Hoyer found Andrew Hawkins on a 4-yard touchdown pass for a 16–6 lead followed by Ben Tate running in the end zone for a 5-yard touchdown for a 23–6 game. The Raiders wrapped up the scoring of the game later on when Derek Carr found Andre Holmes 10-yard touchdown pass for the final score: 23–13.

With the loss, the Raiders fell to 0–7.

==== Week 9 ====
Team	1	2	3	4	Total
Raiders	3	0	14	7	24
• Seahawks	14	10	0	6	30

- Date: November 2
- Location: CenturyLink Field
- Game start: 4:25 p.m. EST
- Game attendance: 68,337
- Game weather: Rain; 54 °F (12 °C)
- Referee: Ed Hochuli
- TV announcers (CBS): Kevin Harlan and Rich Gannon
- Source: Recap, Gamebook

Still looking for their first win of the season 7 games through, the Raiders headed up to the Pacific Northwest to take on the defending champion Seattle Seahawks.

The Raiders received the opening kickoff and immediately scored on their first possession by means of a 48-yard field goal by Sebastian Janikowski. Up 3–0, the Oakland defense took the field and was unable to stop the Seahawks from responding. Seattle took advantage of the multiple flags against the defense as Marshawn Lynch and Russell Wilson facilitated a 72-yard drive to score the game's first touchdown on a 3-yard run by Lynch. Both teams went 3-and-out on their next offensive possession before Derek Carr was picked off by Seahawks LB Bruce Irvin who returned it 35 yards for a touchdown on the final play of the first quarter.

In the second quarter, Carr was intercepted again, this time by Richard Sherman. Seahawks kicker Steven Hauschka added a field goal to put the Seahawks up 17–3. Meanwhile, the Raiders were unable to stop turning the ball over. After Hauschka's field goal, on the ensuing kickoff, T.J. Carrie's return was fumbled at the Oakland 25 and recovered by Hauschka himself at the 31 yard line. Though the Seahawks were unable to turn it into any points on Hauschka's missed field goal, Lynch picked up his second rushing touchdown of the day later in the quarter, this time from 5 yards out, and the Seahawks led 24–3 at halftime. To start the second half, however, the Raiders scored in less than a minute by blocking Jon Ryan's punt and recovering it in the end zone for a touchdown. With 5 minutes left in the third, Carr connected with tight end Mychal Rivera on a 1-yard touchdown pass to bring Oakland to within 7. Hauschka added two more field goals early in the fourth quarter and the Seahawks had a 13-point advantage with just over 9 minutes remaining. It took the Raiders until two plays after the 2-minute warning to score. Carr hooked up with Rivera again on another 1-yard touchdown pass and left it up to an onside kick to determine the outcome. Unfortunately for Oakland, their onside kick try was recovered by Seattle's Jermaine Kearse, and the Seahawks hung on to claim the victory, 30–24.

With the loss, the Raiders dropped to 0–8 on the season.

==== Week 10 ====
Team	1	2	3	4	Total
• Broncos	3	17	21	0	41
Raiders	3	7	0	7	17

- Date: November 9
- Location: O.co Coliseum
- Game start: 4:00 p.m. EST
- Game attendance: 54,803
- Game weather: Clear; 68 °F (20 °C)
- Referee: Carl Cheffers
- TV announcers (CBS): Greg Gumbel, Trent Green, and Evan Washburn
- Source: Recap, Gamebook

After battling the Super Bowl champions in Week 9, the winless Raiders went back home for Week 10 to take on their divisional rival and the defending AFC Champion Denver Broncos for the first time all year.

Broncos QB Peyton Manning was immediately picked off by cornerback D.J. Hayden on his second pass of the game 30 seconds in. Taking over near midfield, the Raiders got down to the Denver 23, but were forced to kick a 41-yard field goal, which Janikowski was successful on. Broncos kicker Brandon McManus responded with a field goal of his own, and the game was tied at three apiece. In the second quarter, McManus added another field goal and, later in the period, the Raiders intercepted Manning again; this time, it was Justin Tuck. Oakland scored a touchdown off the turnover and took a 10–6 lead on a Derek Carr five-yard touchdown pass to wide receiver Brice Butler. However, after two unsuccessful drives for each team, Carr was intercepted by Denver cornerback Bradley Roby and the Broncos stormed back with two quick touchdowns. Both touchdowns were passes by Manning to C. J. Anderson and Emmanuel Sanders of 51 and 32 yards, respectively. Denver led 20–10 at the half.

In the second half, Oakland's offensive miscues continued as Khalif Barnes fumbled at his own 13-yard line, and the Broncos wasted no time as Manning's 10-yard pass to Julius Thomas put Denver up by 17. Oakland's next possession ended in a punt, and Manning went right back to Thomas for another touchdown, Peyton's fourth of the day and second from 32 yards out. Carr was picked off again, the Broncos scored yet another touchdown on Manning's fifth of the game and second to Emmanuel Sanders, and the visitors took a commanding 41–10 lead. Down 31 points, the Raiders headed into the fourth quarter and were humiliated by the potent Denver offense, and were unable to do much more than score an insignificant touchdown with 53 seconds left. The Broncos left Oakland with a 41–17 win and moved to 7–2 on the season.

Meanwhile, the Raiders' woes continued as their record fell to 0–9.

==== Week 11 ====
Team	1	2	3	4	Total
Raiders	3	0	0	3	6
• Chargers	7	3	3	0	13

- Date: November 16
- Location: Qualcomm Stadium
- Game start: 4:05 p.m. EST
- Game attendance: 66,720
- Game weather: Sunny; 72 °F (22 °C)
- Referee: Jeff Triplette
- TV announcers (CBS): Spero Dedes, Solomon Wilcots, and Scott Kaplan
- Source: Recap, Gamebook

With the loss, the Raiders fell to 0–10 and were the first team this season to be mathematically eliminated from postseason contention. They are the earliest team to be eliminated from the playoffs since the 2004 Miami Dolphins. The loss also mathematically guaranteed a fourth-place finish in the AFC West.

The Raiders also became the first team to start 0–10 after the 2011 Colts. They would later on be joined by the 2016 Cleveland Browns.

==== Week 12 vs Chiefs ====
Week Twelve: Kansas City Chiefs (7–3) at Oakland Raiders (0–10)

Quarter	1	2	3	4	Total
Chiefs	0	3	7	10	**20**
Raiders	7	7	3	7	**24**

at O.co Coliseum • Oakland, California

- Date: November 20
- Game time: 8:20 p.m. EDT
- Game weather: Cloudy • 57 °F (14 °C) • Wind SSE 6 miles per hour (9.7 km/h; 5.2 kn)
- Game attendance: 52,865
- Referee: John Parry
- TV announcers (NFLN): Jim Nantz, Phil Simms, and Tracy Wolfson
- Gamebook

Game information

Chiefs

- Alex Smith
  20/36, 234 Yds, 2 TD
- Jamaal Charles
  19 Rush, 80 Yds
- Travis Kelce
  4 Rec, 67 Yds

Raiders

- Derek Carr
  18/35, 174 Yds, TD
- Latavius Murray
  4 Rush, 112 Yds, 2 TD
- Andre Holmes
  5 Rec, 55 Yds

With the upset win the Raiders not only improved to 1–10, but they finally snapped a 16-game losing streak which dated back to 2013. Also, QB Derek Carr got his first career NFL win as a starter.

Scoring summary

Quarter	Time	Drive			Team	Scoring information	Score	
Quarter	Time	Plays	Yards	TOP	Team	Scoring information	KC	OAK
1	6:33	8	60	3:29	Raiders	Latavius Murray 11-yard touchdown run, Sebastian Janikowski kick good	0	7
2	12:28	1	90	0:12	Raiders	Latavius Murray 90-yard touchdown run, Sebastian Janikowski kick good	0	14
2	7:19	4	6	0:52	Chiefs	24-yard field goal by Cairo Santos	3	14
3	5:05	9	27	4:39	Raiders	40-yard field goal by Sebastian Janikowski	3	17
3	1:52	6	60	3:13	Chiefs	Anthony Fasano 19-yard touchdown reception from Alex Smith, Cairo Santos kick good	10	17
4	12:20	4	65	2:19	Chiefs	Jamaal Charles 30-yard touchdown reception from Alex Smith, Cairo Santos kick good	17	17
4	9:03	5	30	2:10	Chiefs	25-yard field goal by Cairo Santos	20	17
4	1:42	17	80	7:21	Raiders	James Jones 9-yard touchdown reception from Derek Carr, Sebastian Janikowski kick good	20	24
"TOP" = time of possession. For other American football terms, see Glossary of American football.							20	24

==== Week 13 ====
Team	1	2	3	4	Total
Raiders	0	0	0	0	0
• Rams	21	17	0	14	52

- Date: November 30
- Location: Edward Jones Dome
- Game start: 1:00 p.m. EST
- Game attendance: 55,650
- Game weather: Indoors (dome)
- Referee: Gene Steratore
- TV announcers (CBS): Andrew Catalon and Steve Beuerlein
- Source: Recap, Gamebook

The Raiders couldn't get things going offensively all game long as Derek Carr's inconsistency led to his benching. He was replaced by Matt Schuab in the second half. The defense wasn't a factor either as they couldn't stop the Rams' offense, especially their running game. The Raiders looked to respond after allowing 38 points in the first half, but it was too late as they would go on to lose in a 52–0 embarrassment.

==== Week 14 ====
Team	1	2	3	4	Total
49ers	7	3	3	0	13
• Raiders	3	7	7	7	24

- Date: December 7
- Location: O.co Coliseum
- Game start: 4:25 p.m. EST
- Game attendance: 55,300
- Game weather: Overcast; 63 °F (17 °C)
- Referee: Terry McAulay
- TV announcers (Fox): Chris Myers, Ronde Barber, and Jennifer Hale
- Source: Recap, Gamebook

Scoring summary
Q1	11:46	OAK	Janikowski 57 yard field goal	OAK 3–0
Q1	1:54	SF	Miller 8 yard pass from Kaepernick (Dawson kick)	SF 7–3
Q2	10:45	OAK	Penn 3 yard pass from Carr (Janikowski kick)	OAK 10–7
Q2	0:01	SF	Dawson 52 yard field goal	Tie 10–10
Q3	8:34	SF	Dawson 20 yard field goal	SF 13–10
Q3	4:09	OAK	Reece 9 yard pass from Carr (Janikowski kick)	OAK 17–13
Q4	10:39	OAK	Rivera 5 yard pass from Carr (Janikowski kick)	OAK 24–13

This would snap a 13-game losing streak for Raiders against NFC teams. This would also be their first win against their Bay Area rivals since 2000.

==== Week 15 ====
Team	1	2	3	4	Total
Raiders	0	3	3	7	13
• Chiefs	7	3	21	0	31

- Date: December 14
- Location: Arrowhead Stadium
- Game start: 1:00 p.m. EST
- Game attendance: 72,153
- Game weather: Cloudy; 58 °F (14 °C)
- Referee: Jerome Boger
- TV announcers (CBS): Spero Dedes and Solomon Wilcots
- Source: Recap, Gamebook

==== Week 16 ====
Team	1	2	3	4	Total
Bills	7	3	0	14	24
• Raiders	0	13	6	7	26

- Date: December 21
- Location: O.co Coliseum
- Game start: 4:25 p.m. EST
- Game attendance: 53,436
- Game weather: Cloudy; 64 °F (18 °C)
- Referee: Craig Wrolstad
- TV announcers (CBS): Brian Anderson and Chris Simms

Source: Recap, Gamebook

==== Week 17 ====
Team	1	2	3	4	Total
Raiders	7	0	7	0	14
• Broncos	10	10	10	17	47

- Date: December 28
- Location: Sports Authority Field at Mile High
- Game start: 4:25 p.m. EST
- Game attendance: 76,929
- Game weather: Partly cloudy; 40 °F (4 °C)
- Referee: Clete Blakeman
- TV announcers (CBS): Greg Gumbel, Trent Green, and Evan Washburn
- Source: Recap, Gamebook

With the loss, the Raiders ended their season 3–13.

== Standings ==
=== Division ===
AFC West
	W	L	T	PCT	DIV	CONF	PF	PA	STK
^{(2)} Denver Broncos	12	4	0	.750	6–0	10–2	482	354	W1
Kansas City Chiefs (Note: Kansas City is ranked ahead of San Diego based on head-to-head sweep (Week 7, 23–20; Week 17, 19–7).)	9	7	0	.563	3–3	7–5	353	281	W1
San Diego Chargers	9	7	0	.563	2–4	6–6	348	348	L1
Oakland Raiders	3	13	0	.188	1–5	2–10	253	452	L1

=== Conference ===
AFC
#	Team	Division	W	L	T	PCT	DIV	CONF	SOS	SOV	STK
Division leaders
1 (Note: New England defeated Denver head-to-head (Week 9, 43–21).)	New England Patriots	East	12	4	0	.750	4–2	9–3	.514	.487	L1
2	Denver Broncos	West	12	4	0	.750	6–0	10–2	.521	.484	W1
3 (Note: Pittsburgh defeated Indianapolis head-to-head (Week 8, 51–34).)	Pittsburgh Steelers	North	11	5	0	.688	4–2	9–3	.451	.486	W4
4	Indianapolis Colts	South	11	5	0	.688	6–0	9–3	.479	.372	W1
Wild Cards
5	Cincinnati Bengals	North	10	5	1	.656	3–3	7–5	.498	.425	L1
6	Baltimore Ravens	North	10	6	0	.625	3–3	6–6	.475	.378	W1
Did not qualify for the postseason
7 (Note: Kansas City finished ahead of San Diego in the AFC West based on head-to-head sweep (Week 7, 23–20; Week 17, 19–7). Houston finished ahead of Kansas City and Buffalo based on conference record. Kansas City finished ahead of Buffalo based on head-to-head victory (Week 10, 17–13). San Diego finished ahead of Buffalo based on head-to-head victory (Week 3, 22–10).)	Houston Texans	South	9	7	0	.563	4–2	8–4	.447	.299	W2
8	Kansas City Chiefs	West	9	7	0	.563	3–3	7–5	.512	.500	W1
9	San Diego Chargers	West	9	7	0	.563	2–4	6–6	.512	.403	L1
10	Buffalo Bills	East	9	7	0	.563	4–2	5–7	.516	.486	W1
11	Miami Dolphins	East	8	8	0	.500	3–3	6–6	.512	.406	L1
12	Cleveland Browns	North	7	9	0	.438	2–4	4–8	.479	.371	L5
13	New York Jets	East	4	12	0	.250	1–5	4–8	.543	.375	W1
14 (Note: Jacksonville finished ahead of Oakland based on record vs. common opponents (1–4 to 0–5).)	Jacksonville Jaguars	South	3	13	0	.188	1–5	2–10	.514	.313	L1
15	Oakland Raiders	West	3	13	0	.188	1–5	2–10	.570	.542	L1
16	Tennessee Titans	South	2	14	0	.125	1–5	2–10	.506	.375	L10
Tiebreakers (Note: When breaking ties for three or more teams under the NFL's rules, they are first broken within divisions, then comparing only the highest ranked remaining team from each division.)
