= Mychal Rivera =

American football player (born 1990)

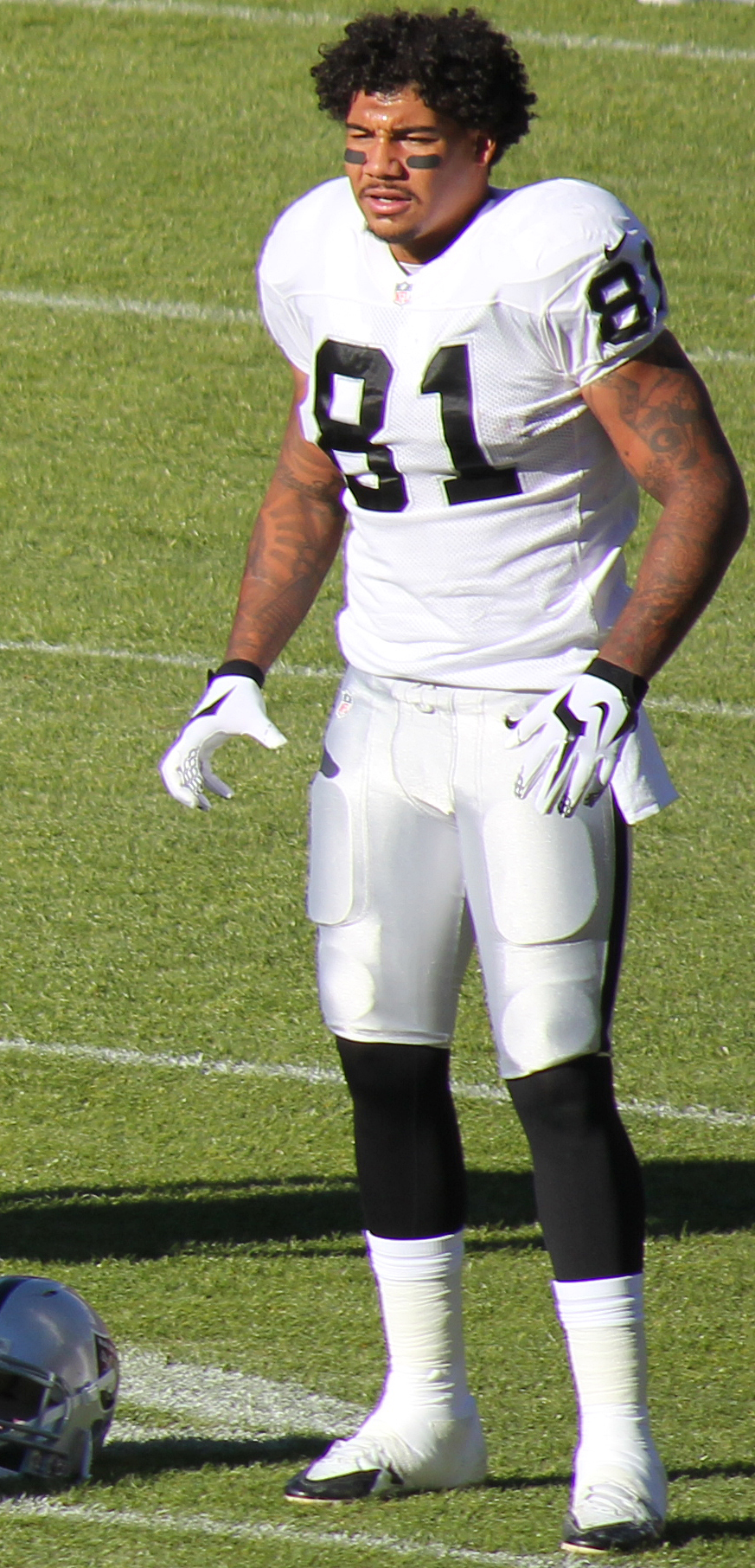
- Rivera with the Oakland Raiders in 2014

No. 81
- Position: Tight end

Personal information
- Born: September 8, 1990 (age 36); Los Angeles, California, U.S.
- Listed height: 6 ft 4 in (1.93 m)
- Listed weight: 235 lb (107 kg)

Career information
- High school: Birmingham (Los Angeles, California)
- College: Oregon (2008); Canyons (2009); Tennessee (2010–2012)
- NFL draft: 2013: 6th round, 184th overall pick

Career history
- Oakland Raiders (2013–2016); Jacksonville Jaguars (2017)

Awards and highlights
- First-team All-SEC (2012)

Career NFL statistics
- Receptions: 146
- Receiving yards: 1,413
- Receiving touchdowns: 10
- Stats at Pro Football Reference

Mychal Rashawn Rivera (born September 8, 1990) is an American former professional football player who was a tight end in the National Football League (NFL). He played college football for the Tennessee Volunteers and was selected by the Oakland Raiders in the sixth round of the 2013 NFL draft.

== Early life ==
Rivera was born in Los Angeles, California, the son of George and Yolanda Rivera. He is of Puerto Rican, African American, and German descent. Though he lived in Valencia, California, he played high school football for Birmingham High School in Lake Balboa, where he caught 21 passes for 210 yards and 3 touchdowns as a senior in 2007 to help lead the Patriots to a 13–1 record and the West Valley League championship. He was rated a 3-star prospect, and ranked the 39th overall tight end by Rivals.com for the 2007 class.

== College career ==
Rivera initially signed with Oregon for the 2008 season. After he was asked to move to offensive line by Ducks coach Chip Kelly he requested and received a release from his scholarship. For the 2009 season, he played for the College of the Canyons, a junior college in Santa Clarita, catching 32 passes for 316 yards and 3 touchdowns.

In January 2010, Rivera committed to the Tennessee Volunteers, having been drawn to the school by the emphasis on tight ends in the offensive scheme of newly hired head coach Derek Dooley. He played in all 13 games in the 2010 season, collecting 11 catches for 112 yards. Against Ole Miss, he caught a 26-yard pass on a 3rd-and-13 to keep a critical drive alive. His season-best was 3 catches for 29 yards against Memphis.

Rivera started all 12 games for the Volunteers in 2011. He caught 29 passes for 344 yards and a touchdown, placing third among SEC tight ends in both receptions and receiving yards. Against Florida, he had 5 catches for 71 yards, including an 18-yard touchdown reception. He caught 5 passes for 85 yards against Georgia.

Named to the Pre-Season All-SEC Third-team prior to the 2012 season, Rivera started in 10 of 12 games. He caught 36 passes for 562 yards and 5 touchdowns, breaking the single-season team record set by Jason Witten for most receiving yards by a tight end, and joining Reggie Harper as one of two Tennessee Volunteers tight ends with more than 1,000 career receiving yards. Rivera caught 4 passes for 47 yards and a touchdown against Florida. He caught 3 passes for 82 yards against Georgia, including a career-long 62-yard reception. Against Missouri, he caught 10 passes for 129 yards and a touchdown. Following the season, he was named All-SEC by both CBSSports and the SEC coaches, and All-SEC Second-team by the Associated Press.

== Professional career ==
Pre-draft measurables
Height	Weight	Arm length	Hand span	40-yard dash	10-yard split	20-yard split	20-yard shuttle	Three-cone drill	Vertical jump	Broad jump	Bench press
6 ft 3 1/4 in (1.91 m)	242 lb (110 kg)	32 5/8 in (0.83 m)	10 1/4 in (0.26 m)	4.81 s	1.66 s	2.69 s	4.43 s	7.17 s	31.0 in (0.79 m)	9 ft 4 in (2.84 m)	17 reps
All values from NFL Combine

=== Oakland Raiders ===
==== 2013 ====
The Oakland Raiders selected Rivera in the sixth round (184th overall) of the 2013 NFL draft. Rivera was the 11th tight end drafted in 2013. He was the second tight end drafted by the Raiders in 2013, behind Nick Kasa who was selected in the sixth round (172nd overall).

He began his rookie season as the backup tight end behind Jeron Mastrud and caught two passes for 26-yards in a season opening loss to the Indianapolis Colts. On September 29, 2013, against Washington, he caught his first career touchdown on an 18-yard pass from Matt Flynn. The following week, Rivera earned his first career start against the San Diego Chargers. On November 17, 2013, he caught a season-high five passes for 54 receiving yards and caught his second touchdown pass on a 26-yard pass from Matt McGloin. Rivera suffered a concussion following a helmet-to-helmet hit by Michael Griffin in the Raiders' loss to the Tennessee Titans on November 24, 2013. He finished his first season with 38 catches for 407 receiving yards and 4 touchdowns while starting 3 games and appearing in all 16 regular season contests.

==== 2014 ====
Rivera began his second season as the starting tight end but shared the role throughout the year with David Ausberry. In the season opener against the New York Jets, he caught three passes for 31 yards. After an 0–4 start, head coach Dennis Allen was fired and Tony Sparano was named the interim head coach. On November 2, 2014, Rivera finished a loss to the Seattle Seahawks with a career-high 8 receptions for 38 receiving yards and caught his first two touchdown passes of the season from rookie quarterback Derek Carr. The following week against the Denver Broncos, he caught 6 passes for 64-yards and a touchdown during the Raider's 17–41 loss. On December 7, 2014, Rivera caught 7 passes for a career-high 109 receiving yards and a touchdown against the San Francisco 49ers. He finished his second season with 58 catches, 534 receiving yards, and 4 touchdowns in 10 starts and 16 regular season games. The Oakland Raiders finished 3–13 in 2014.

==== 2015 ====
After a career season in 2014, he was thought to be the starting tight end going into the 2015 season, but head coach Jack Del Rio brought in free agent Lee Smith and drafted Clive Walford in the third round of the 2015 NFL draft. Although he began the season as the backup to Smith he eventually lost snaps to the emerging Walford. On November 15, 2015, he had one of his best games of the season when he caught a season-high six passes for 46 receiving yards during a 14–30 loss to the Minnesota Vikings. During a Week 14 victory over the eventual Super Bowl 50 Champion Denver Broncos, he caught 3 passes for a season-high 49 receiving yards as well as his only touchdown of the season. In his third professional season, Rivera was limited to only 32 catches for 280 receiving yards and one touchdown while appearing in all regular season games and starting none.

==== 2016 ====
With Walford slated as the starting tight end going into the 2016 season after emerging in the last month of the 2015 season, the Oakland Raiders reportedly were looking to trade Rivera. After not being able to seek a trade partner, the Raiders opted to keep him for at least the last year of his rookie contract.

With Walford slated as the starting tight end to begin the season, Rivera did not register a catch until a Week 4 matchup against the Baltimore Ravens and finished the victory with only one catch for a yard. On October 30, 2016, he had his best game of the season, making 3 receptions for 36 receiving yards and caught his first touchdown of the season from Derek Carr. He finished the 2016 season with 18 receptions for 192 yards and one touchdown in 13 games and two starts.

=== Jacksonville Jaguars ===
On March 22, 2017, Rivera signed with the Jacksonville Jaguars. In doing so, he reunited with former high school and college teammate Malik Jackson. On September 1, 2017, Rivera was placed on injured reserve with a hand injury. On February 20, 2018, the Jaguars declined the option on Rivera's contract, making him a free agent.

== NFL career statistics ==
Legend
**Bold**	Career high

=== Regular season ===
Year	Team	Games		Receiving					
Year	Team	GP	GS	Tgt	Rec	Yds	Avg	Lng	TD
2013	OAK	**16**	3	60	38	407	**10.7**	**37**	**4**
2014	OAK	**16**	**10**	**99**	**58**	**534**	9.2	33	**4**
2015	OAK	**16**	0	46	32	280	8.8	29	1
2016	OAK	13	2	25	18	192	**10.7**	27	1
		61	15	230	146	1,413	9.7	37	10

=== Playoffs ===
Year	Team	Games		Receiving					
Year	Team	GP	GS	Tgt	Rec	Yds	Avg	Lng	TD
2016	OAK	**1**	0	**5**	**4**	**31**	**7.8**	**11**	0
		1	0	5	4	31	7.8	11	0

== Personal life ==
Rivera was born in Los Angeles, California. He is of Puerto Rican, African American, and German descent. His parents are Yolanda Rivera, a former model, and George Rivera. His older sister was actress and singer Naya Rivera (1987–2020), best known for her role as Santana Lopez on Glee. His younger sister is runway model Nickayla Rivera (b. 1994).

== See also ==
- List of Afro-Latinos
