= Pat Sims =

American football player (born 1985)

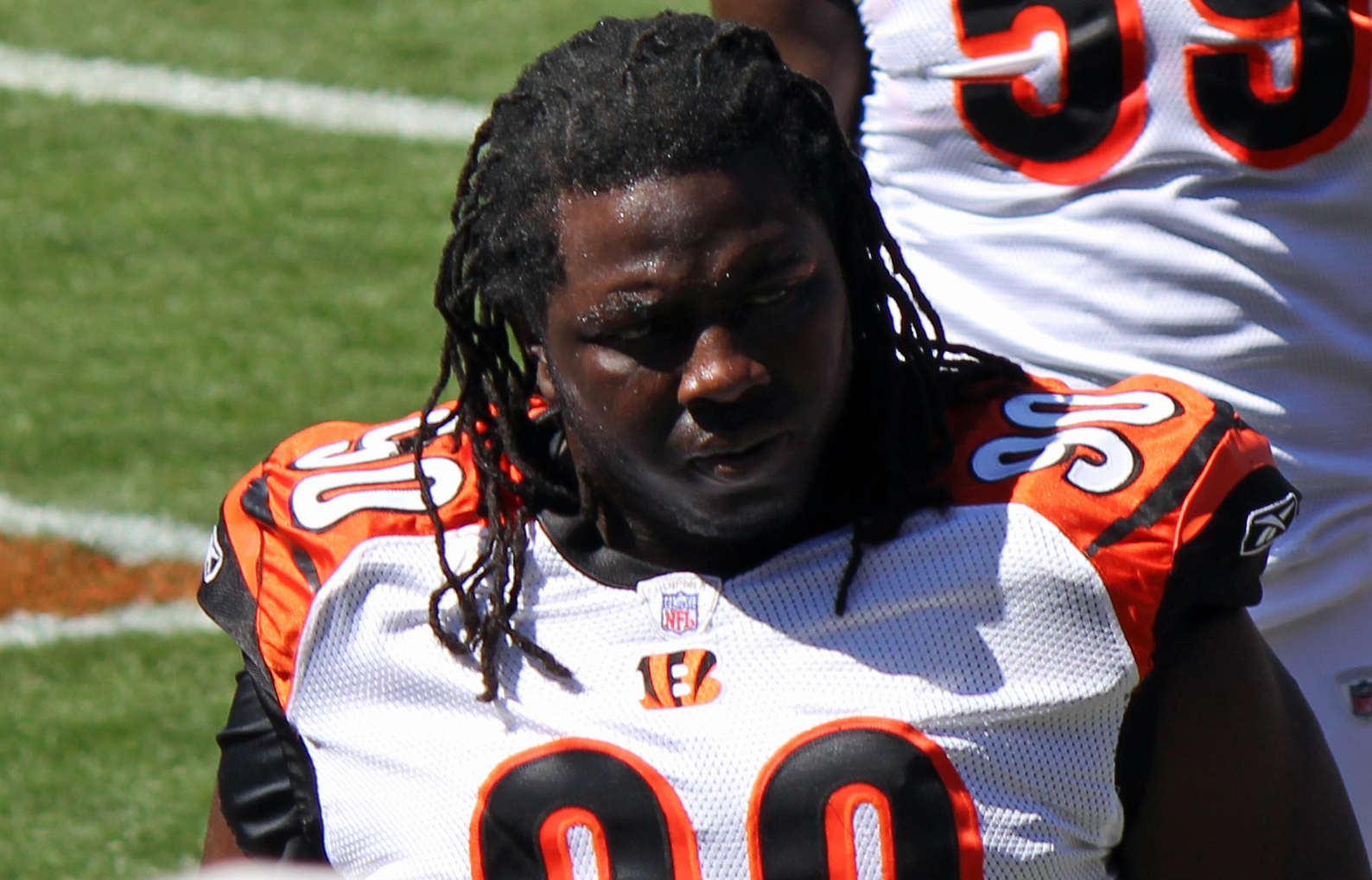
- Sims with the Cincinnati Bengals in 2011

No. 90, 92
- Position: Defensive tackle

Personal information
- Born: November 29, 1985 (age 40); Fort Lauderdale, Florida, U.S.
- Listed height: 6 ft 4 in (1.93 m)
- Listed weight: 312 lb (142 kg)

Career information
- High school: Dillard (Ft. Lauderdale)
- College: Auburn
- NFL draft: 2008: 3rd round, 77th overall pick

Career history
- Cincinnati Bengals (2008–2012); Oakland Raiders (2013–2014); Cincinnati Bengals (2015–2017)

Awards and highlights
- First-team All-SEC (2007); 2007 Chick-fil-A Bowl MVP

Career NFL statistics
- Total tackles: 294
- Sacks: 9
- Fumble recoveries: 1
- Interceptions: 1
- Stats at Pro Football Reference

Patrick Sims (born November 29, 1985) is an American former professional football player who was a defensive tackle in the National Football League (NFL). He was selected by the Cincinnati Bengals in the third round of the 2008 NFL draft and also played for the Oakland Raiders. He played college football for the Auburn Tigers.

== Early life ==
Sims played high school football at Dillard High School in Fort Lauderdale before attending Auburn University to play college football. He was picked with the 77th pick in the 3rd round in the 2008 NFL draft by the Cincinnati Bengals.

== Professional career ==
=== Cincinnati Bengals (first stint) ===
Sims was selected by the Bengals in the third round, 77th overall, in the 2008 NFL draft. He played with the Bengals from 2008 to 2012 after re-signing on March 24, 2012.

=== Oakland Raiders ===
Sims signed with the Oakland Raiders on March 13, 2013. He re-signed with the Raiders on March 28, 2014.

=== Cincinnati Bengals (second stint) ===
Sims signed with the Bengals on March 26, 2015. Sims has been praised for his strong play on the interior against the run.

On March 16, 2016, Sims re-signed with the Bengals on a two-year contract.

On November 18, 2017, Sims was released by the Bengals, but was re-signed three days later.

== NFL career statistics ==
Legend
| **Bold** | Career high |

=== Regular season ===
| Year | Team | Games | | Tackles | | | | | Interceptions | | | | | Fumbles | | | |
| Year | Team | GP | GS | Cmb | Solo | Ast | Sck | TFL | Int | Yds | TD | Lng | PD | FF | FR | Yds | TD |
|---|---|---|---|---|---|---|---|---|---|---|---|---|---|---|---|---|---|
| 2008 | CIN | 11 | 6 | 35 | 22 | 13 | 1.0 | 3 | 0 | 0 | 0 | 0 | 0 | 0 | 0 | 0 | 0 |
| 2009 | CIN | **16** | 8 | 34 | 19 | 15 | 0.5 | 2 | 0 | 0 | 0 | 0 | 0 | 0 | **1** | 0 | 0 |
| 2010 | CIN | 14 | 8 | 31 | 19 | 12 | **2.5** | 4 | 0 | 0 | 0 | 0 | **1** | 0 | 0 | 0 | 0 |
| 2011 | CIN | 11 | 1 | 20 | 11 | 9 | 1.0 | 2 | 0 | 0 | 0 | 0 | 0 | 0 | 0 | 0 | 0 |
| 2012 | CIN | 8 | 0 | 17 | 12 | 5 | 0.0 | 2 | **1** | **3** | 0 | **3** | **1** | 0 | 0 | 0 | 0 |
| 2013 | OAK | **16** | **16** | **54** | **41** | 13 | 2.0 | **8** | 0 | 0 | 0 | 0 | 0 | 0 | 0 | 0 | 0 |
| 2014 | OAK | **16** | 2 | 25 | 17 | 8 | 0.0 | 1 | 0 | 0 | 0 | 0 | **1** | 0 | 0 | 0 | 0 |
| 2015 | CIN | 8 | 0 | 16 | 4 | 12 | 0.0 | 0 | 0 | 0 | 0 | 0 | 0 | 0 | 0 | 0 | 0 |
| 2016 | CIN | **16** | 0 | 37 | 15 | **22** | 1.5 | 5 | 0 | 0 | 0 | 0 | 0 | 0 | 0 | 0 | 0 |
| 2017 | CIN | 14 | 8 | 25 | 9 | 16 | 0.5 | 3 | 0 | 0 | 0 | 0 | 0 | 0 | 0 | 0 | 0 |
| | | 130 | 49 | 294 | 169 | 125 | 9.0 | 30 | 1 | 3 | 0 | 3 | 3 | 0 | 1 | 0 | 0 |

=== Playoffs ===
| Year | Team | Games | | Tackles | | | | | Interceptions | | | | | Fumbles | | | |
| Year | Team | GP | GS | Cmb | Solo | Ast | Sck | TFL | Int | Yds | TD | Lng | PD | FF | FR | Yds | TD |
|---|---|---|---|---|---|---|---|---|---|---|---|---|---|---|---|---|---|
| 2012 | CIN | **1** | 0 | **4** | **4** | 0 | 0.0 | 0 | 0 | 0 | 0 | 0 | 0 | 0 | 0 | 0 | 0 |
| 2015 | CIN | **1** | 0 | 1 | 0 | **1** | **0.5** | 0 | 0 | 0 | 0 | 0 | **1** | 0 | 0 | 0 | 0 |
| | | 2 | 0 | 5 | 4 | 1 | 0.5 | 0 | 0 | 0 | 0 | 0 | 1 | 0 | 0 | 0 | 0 |
