= List of Las Vegas Raiders head coaches =

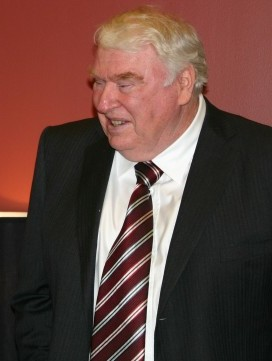
John Madden was the head coach of the Oakland Raiders for ten seasons, from 1969 to 1978.

The Las Vegas Raiders are a professional American football team based in the Las Vegas Valley. The Raiders compete in the National Football League (NFL) as a member club of the league's American Football Conference (AFC) West division. Their stadium is located in Paradise, Nevada. There have been 25 head coaches in Oakland, Los Angeles, and Las Vegas franchise history. Their current coach is Klint Kubiak, who replaced Pete Carroll after he coached the team for one season. The Raiders franchise was founded in Oakland, California in 1959 and became the eighth member of the American Football League (AFL) in 1960 as a replacement for the Minnesota Vikings, who had moved to the NFL. The Raiders joined the NFL in 1970, after the AFL–NFL merger. They played in Los Angeles between 1982 and 1995, before returning to Oakland. As of the end of the 2023 season, the Raiders have played 983 games in a total of 64 seasons in the AFL and NFL. In those games, two coaches have won the Super Bowl with the team: John Madden in 1976 and Tom Flores in 1980 and 1983. One coach, John Rauch in 1966, won the AFL Championship. Five other coaches, Art Shell, Jack Del Rio, Jon Gruden, Bill Callahan, and Rich Bisaccia, have also taken the Raiders to the playoffs. Callahan led the Raiders to the Super Bowl. He did this in his first year as head coach of the team.

Shell and Gruden are the only coaches to have more than one tenure with the team, and Flores and Shell are the only coaches to have coached the team in both Oakland and Los Angeles. Gruden is the only coach to have coached the team in both Oakland and Las Vegas. Rauch is statistically the best, with a winning percentage of .805. However, the all-time leader in both games coached and wins is Madden, with 142 and 103 respectively. Of the 23 Raiders coaches, Al Davis, Madden, and Flores are the only Raider coaches to be inducted into the Pro Football Hall of Fame for their contributions as coaches. Davis, who was also the Managing General partner and an AFL Commissioner, was in the Hall of Fame class of 1992, Madden was in the 2006 class, and Flores was in the 2021 class. Two coaches, Flores and Shell, are also former players for the Raiders. Shell was also inducted into the Hall of Fame in 1989 as a player.

== Key ==
#	Number of coaches
GC	Games coached
W	Wins
L	Losses
T	Ties
Win%	Winning percentage
†	Elected into the Pro Football Hall of Fame as a coach
‡	Elected into the Pro Football Hall of Fame as a player
*	Spent entire NFL head coaching career with the Raiders

== Coaches ==
Note: Statistics are accurate through the end of the 2025 NFL season.

#	Image	Name	Term	Regular season					Playoffs				Awards	Reference
#	Image	Name	Term	GC	W	L	T	Win%	GC	W	L	Win%	Awards	Reference
Oakland Raiders
1		Eddie Erdelatz*	1960–1961*	16	6	10	0	.375	—	—	—	—		
2		Marty Feldman*	1961–1962*	17	2	15	0	.118	—	—	—	—		
3		Red Conkright*^{[a]}	1962*	9	1	8	0	.111	—	—	—	—		
4		Al Davis †*	1963–1965*	42	23	16	3	.583	—	—	—	—	AFL Coach of the Year (1963)	
5		John Rauch	1966–1968	42	33	8	1	.798	4	2	2	.500	AFL Champion (1967)	
6		John Madden †*	1969–1978*	142	103	32	7	.750	16	9	7	.563	Super Bowl Champion (1976); Pro Football Weekly Coach of the Year (1969)	
7		Tom Flores †	1979–1981	48	27	21	0	.563	4	4	0	1.000	Super Bowl Champion (1980)	
7		Tom Flores †	Los Angeles Raiders											
7		Tom Flores †	1982–1987	88	56	32	0	.636	7	4	3	.571	Super Bowl Champion (1983)	
8		Mike Shanahan	1988–1989	20	8	12	0	.400	—	—	—	—		
9		Art Shell ‡*^{[b]}^{[c]}^{[d]}	1989–1994*	92	54	38	0	.587	5	2	3	.400	Pro Football Weekly Coach of the Year (1990)	
Oakland Raiders
10		Mike White*	1995–1996*	32	15	17	0	.469	—	—	—	—		
11		Joe Bugel	1997	16	4	12	0	.250	—	—	—	—		
12		Jon Gruden^{[g]}	1998–2001	64	38	26	0	.594	4	2	2	.500		
13		Bill Callahan	2002–2003	32	15	17	0	.469	3	2	1	.667	AFC Champion (2002)	
14		Norv Turner	2004–2005	32	9	23	0	.281	—	—	—	—		
–		Art Shell ‡*^{[d]}	2006*	16	2	14	0	.125	—	—	—	—		
15		Lane Kiffin*	2007–2008*	20	5	15	0	.250	—	—	—	—		
16		Tom Cable*^{[e]}	2008–2010*	44	17	27	0	.386	—	—	—	—		
17		Hue Jackson	2011	16	8	8	0	.500	—	—	—	—		
18		Dennis Allen	2012–2014	36	8	28	0	.222	—	—	—	—		
19		Tony Sparano^{[f]}	2014	12	3	9	0	.250	—	—	—	—		
20		Jack Del Rio	2015–2017	48	25	23	0	.521	1	0	1	.000		
–		Jon Gruden^{[g]}	2018–2019	32	11	21	0	.344	—	—	—	—		
–		Jon Gruden^{[g]}	Las Vegas Raiders											
–		Jon Gruden^{[g]}	2020–2021	21	11	10	0	.524	—	—	—	—		
21		Rich Bisaccia*^{[h]}	2021	12	7	5	0	.583	1	0	1	.000		
22		Josh McDaniels	2022–2023	25	9	16	0	.360	—	—	—	—		
23		Antonio Pierce*^{[i]}	2023–2024	26	9	17	0	.346	—	—	—	—		
24		Pete Carroll	2025	17	3	14	0	.176	—	—	—	—		
25		Klint Kubiak	2026	4	3	1	0	.750	—	—	—	–		

== Footnotes ==
- ^{a} Feldman was fired five games into the 1962 season. Conkright served as interim head coach for the remaining nine games.
- ^{b} Shanahan was fired four games into the 1989 season. Shell served as interim head coach for the remaining twelve games and was subsequently hired as the permanent head coach.
- ^{c} Shell was inducted into the Pro Football Hall of fame as a player in 1989.
- ^{d} Shell had two tenures as the team's head coach.
- ^{e} Kiffin was fired four games into the 2008 season. Cable served as interim head coach for the remaining twelve games and was subsequently hired as the permanent head coach.
- ^{f} Allen was fired four games into the 2014 season. Sparano served as interim head coach for the remaining twelve games.
- ^{g} Gruden had two tenures as the team's head coach.
- ^{h} Gruden resigned five games into the 2021 season. Bisaccia served as interim head coach for the remaining twelve regular season games and one playoff game.
- ^{i} McDaniels was fired eight games into the 2023 season. Pierce served as interim head coach for the remaining nine games and was subsequently hired as the permanent head coach.
