= Sio Moore =

Liberian gridiron football player (born 1990)

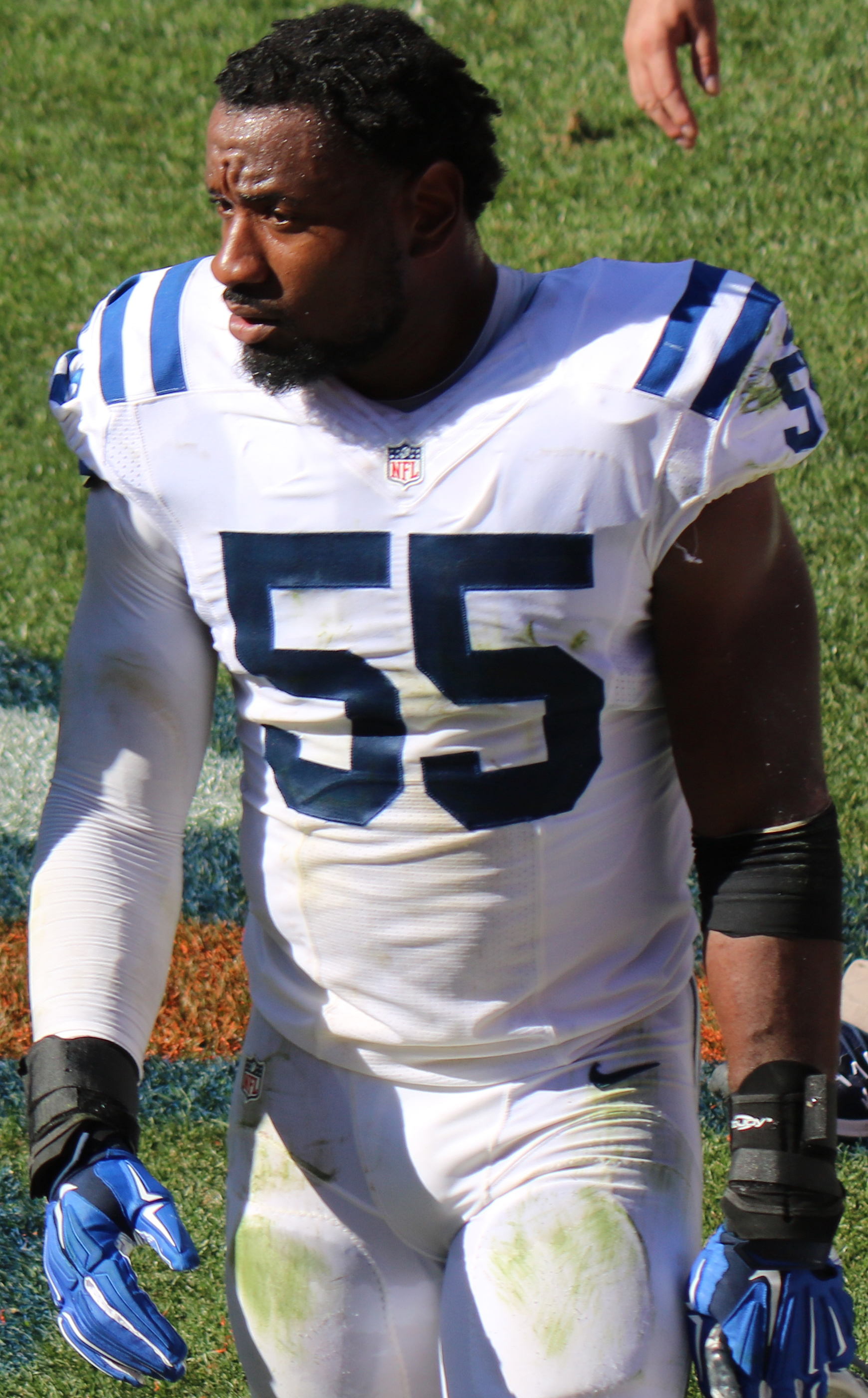
- Moore with the Indianapolis Colts in 2016

No. 55, 51, 54
- Position: Linebacker

Personal information
- Born: 2 May 1990 (age 36); Monrovia, Liberia
- Listed height: 6 ft 1 in (1.85 m)
- Listed weight: 245 lb (111 kg)

Career information
- High school: Apex (Apex, North Carolina, U.S.)
- College: Connecticut (2008–2012)
- NFL draft: 2013: 3rd round, 66th overall pick

Career history
- Oakland Raiders (2013–2014); Indianapolis Colts (2015–2016); Kansas City Chiefs (2016); Arizona Cardinals (2016); Houston Texans (2017)*
- * Offseason or practice squad member only

Awards and highlights
- PFWA All-Rookie Team (2013); First-team All-Big East (2012)

Career NFL statistics
- Total tackles: 218
- Sacks: 7.5
- Forced fumbles: 4
- Stats at Pro Football Reference

Snorsio Alston "Sio" Moore (born 2 May 1990) is a Liberian former professional player of American football who was a linebacker in the National Football League (NFL). He played college football for the UConn Huskies. Moore was selected by the Oakland Raiders in the third round of the 2013 NFL draft. He was also a member of the Indianapolis Colts, Kansas City Chiefs, Arizona Cardinals, and Houston Texans.

== Early life ==
Moore was born in Liberia in West Africa, and moved to the West Haven, Connecticut when he was a child. He attended Apex High School in Apex, North Carolina, where he was a letterman in football and track. He played football as a linebacker, running back and fullback. He earned All-area and All-Tri Seven Football League honors as a fullback and linebacker as a senior.

Prior to signing with Connecticut, Moore made a visit to their summer camp in Storrs, Connecticut, where he was timed at 4.54 in the 40-yard dash, 4.41 in the short shuttle, had a 38.5-inch (99 cm) vertical jump, broad jumped 10-foot-2 (3.13 m) and ran the 100-meter dash in 11.1 seconds.

Regarded only as a two-star prospect grade by both Rivals.com and Scout.com, Moore was ranked No. 50 among the nation’s weak-side linebackers. He signed his national letter of intent to attend Connecticut on 12 July 2007.

== College career ==
While attending the University of Connecticut, he played for the Connecticut Huskies football team from 2008 to 2012. During his college career, he totaled 274 tackles, 16 quarterback sacks and four interceptions. Following his senior season in 2012, he was a first-team All-Big East Conference selection and was invited to play in both the East-West Shrine Game and the Senior Bowl.

== Professional career ==
Pre-draft measurables
Height	Weight	Arm length	Hand span	40-yard dash	10-yard split	20-yard split	20-yard shuttle	Three-cone drill	Vertical jump	Broad jump	Bench press
6 ft 0 3/4 in (1.85 m)	245 lb (111 kg)	33 5/8 in (0.85 m)	10 1/4 in (0.26 m)	4.65 s	1.58 s	2.64 s	4.31 s	7.49 s	38 in (0.97 m)	10 ft 7 in (3.23 m)	29 reps
All values from NFL Combine

=== Oakland Raiders ===
Moore was selected by the Oakland Raiders in the third round, with the 66th overall pick, of the 2013 NFL draft. On 27 October 2013, Moore picked up 2 sacks and 5 tackles in a 21-18 win against the Pittsburgh Steelers. He was named to the PFWA All-Rookie Team.

=== Indianapolis Colts ===
On 4 September 2015, Moore was traded to the Indianapolis Colts for a sixth round pick (Cory James) in the 2016 NFL draft. He was released by the Colts on 4 October 2016.

=== Kansas City Chiefs ===
Moore was signed by the Kansas City Chiefs on 7 October 2016. On 1 November 2016, he was released by the Chiefs.

=== Arizona Cardinals ===
On 22 November 2016, Moore was signed by the Arizona Cardinals.

=== Houston Texans ===
On 3 June 2017, Moore signed with the Houston Texans. On 1 September 2017, he was released by the Texans.

== NFL career statistics ==
Legend
**Bold**	Career high

Year	Team	Games		Tackles					Interceptions					Fumbles			
Year	Team	GP	GS	Cmb	Solo	Ast	Sck	TFL	Int	Yds	TD	Lng	PD	FF	FR	Yds	TD
2013	OAK	**15**	**11**	50	38	12	**4.5**	6	0	0	0	0	0	1	0	0	0
2014	OAK	11	**11**	**90**	**67**	**23**	3.0	**9**	0	0	0	0	**1**	1	0	0	0
2015	IND	12	0	13	9	4	0.0	2	0	0	0	0	0	0	0	0	0
2016	IND	4	4	30	25	5	0.0	2	0	0	0	0	0	0	0	0	0
2016	ARI	4	3	35	25	10	0.0	3	0	0	0	0	**1**	**2**	0	0	0
		46	29	218	164	54	7.5	22	0	0	0	0	2	4	0	0	0
