= Eric Sanders (American football coach) =

American football coach (born 1983)

Montana Grizzlies
- Title: Defensive coordinator

Personal information
- Born: 1983 (age 42–43); San Francisco, California, U.S.

Career information
- College: UC Davis

Career history
- UC Davis (2003–2005) Video coordinator; UC Davis (2006) Tight ends coach & assistant offensive line coach; Utah State (2007) Graduate assistant/defense; UC Davis (2008–2009) Linebackers coach; Oakland Raiders (2010–2011) Offensive quality control coach; Oakland Raiders (2012–2014) Defensive quality control coach; Stanford (2015) Defensive assistant; Cleveland Browns (2016–2018) Defensive assistant; New York Jets (2019) Defensive assistant; Stanford (2020–2022) Inside linebackers coach; Eastern Washington (2023) Linebackers coach & Defensive Run Game Coordinator; Eastern Washington (2024–2025) Defensive coordinator & linebackers coach; Montana (2026–present) Defensive coordinator & linebackers coach

Eric Sanders is an American football coach who is the defensive coordinator for the Montana Grizzlies. Previously, he was the defensive coordinator for the Eastern Washington Eagles, the inside linebackers coach for Stanford and a defensive assistant for the New York Jets of the National Football League (NFL). Sanders was on the Oakland Raiders coaching staff when Hue Jackson was the head coach. He worked as a student with the UC Davis football program before graduating in 2005 with a degree in psychology with a biological emphasis.

He has experience coaching at the college level with UC Davis, Utah State, and Stanford. He spent five years in the NFL with the Oakland Raiders, then returned to the college ranks with Stanford before joining the Browns in 2016.

== Coaching career ==
=== Early coaching career ===
Sanders began his coaching career in 2003 while still a student at UC Davis as a student assistant coach and video coordinator. He remained in that role until 2005 where with UC Davis he traveled to the Far East for coaches clinics with the American Football in China Exchange Association. In 2006 he was promoted to an on the field role and he worked as the team’s offensive line and tight ends coach. In 2007 he worked as a graduate assistant for Utah State. In 2008 he returned to his alma mater to work as the team’s linebackers coach a position he held until after the 2009 season.

=== Oakland Raiders ===
In 2010 and 2011 Sanders worked for the Oakland Raiders as an offensive quality control coach. From 2012 to 2014 he worked as a defensive quality control coach.

=== Stanford (first stint) ===
In 2015 Sanders worked at Stanford as a defensive assistant for the Cardinal.

=== Cleveland Browns ===
From 2016 to 2018, Sanders worked for the Browns as a defensive assistant. He was not retained by Freddie Kitchens.

=== New York Jets ===
In 2019 he worked for the Jets as a defensive assistant under Adam Gase.

=== Stanford (second stint) ===
In 2020 Sanders rejoined the Cardinal this time as the teams inside linebackers coach.

=== Eastern Washington ===
Sanders spent the 2023 season as the linebackers coach and defensive run game coordinator for Eastern Washington. On January 24, 2024, Sanders was promoted to defensive coordinator.

== Personal life ==
Sanders is from San Francisco, California. He and his wife, Maki Ishihara-Sanders, have two sons.
