= Kelly Skipper =

American football coach (born 1967)

Buffalo Bills
- Title: Running backs coach

Personal information
- Born: July 25, 1967 (age 59); Brawley, California, U.S.

Career information
- High school: Winston Churchill (Eugene, Oregon)
- College: Fresno State

Career history
- Fresno State (1989–1997); Graduate assistant (1989–1990); Running backs coach, return specialists coach & recruiting coordinator (1991–1997); UCLA (1998–2002); Running backs coach & kickoff return coach (1998–2000); Offensive coordinator (2001–2002); Washington State (2003–2006) Running backs coach & special teams coach; Oakland Raiders (2007–2014) Running backs coach; Jacksonville Jaguars (2015–2016) Running backs coach; Buffalo Bills (2017–present) Running backs coach

Kelly Demetrius Skipper (born July 25, 1967) is an American football coach who is the running backs coach for the Buffalo Bills of the National Football League (NFL). Previously, he was the running backs coach for the Jacksonville Jaguars from 2015 to 2016. Skipper also served under head coach Dennis Allen for the Oakland Raiders from 2009 to 2014.

Skipper spent two summers doing NFL coaching internships with the Seattle Seahawks and Washington Redskins. He played running back at Fresno State.

Following the 2025 season, the Bills fired head coach Sean McDermott, who Skipper had served under since being hired by Buffalo in 2017. Skipper was retained by new head coach Joe Brady to continue to serve as the team's running backs coach.

== Personal life ==
His father, Jim Skipper, is a retired veteran NFL assistant coach. He has a brother, Tim Skipper, who is currently the head coach at Cal Poly, San Luis Obispo.
