= Stacy McGee =

American football player (born 1990)

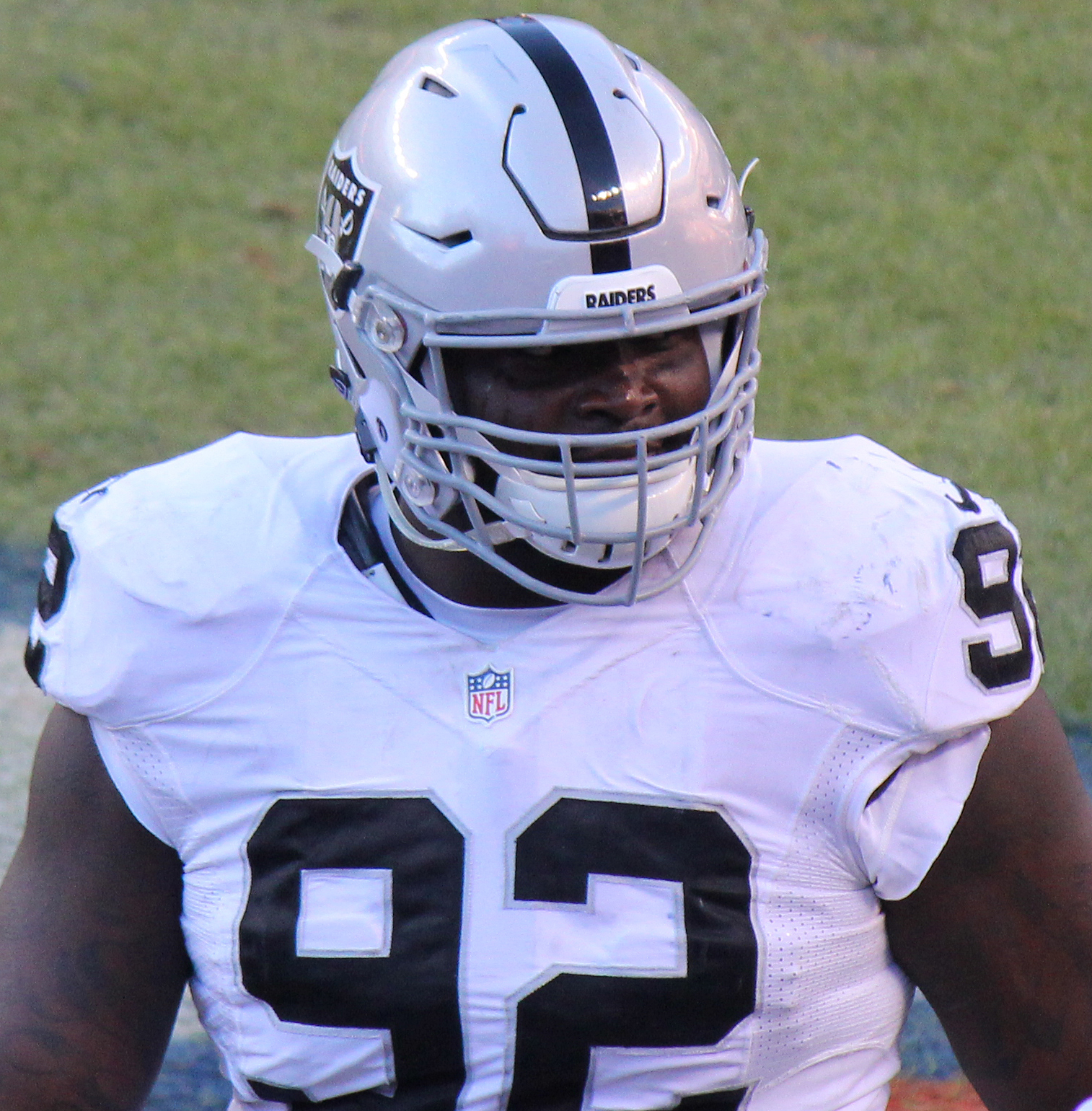
- McGee with the Oakland Raiders in 2015

No. 92, 91, 65
- Position: Defensive end

Personal information
- Born: January 17, 1990 (age 36); Muskogee, Oklahoma, U.S.
- Listed height: 6 ft 3 in (1.91 m)
- Listed weight: 341 lb (155 kg)

Career information
- High school: Muskogee
- College: Oklahoma
- NFL draft: 2013: 6th round, 205th overall pick

Career history
- Oakland Raiders (2013–2016); Washington Redskins (2017–2018); Carolina Panthers (2019); Arizona Cardinals (2020)

Career NFL statistics
- Total tackles: 118
- Sacks: 4.5
- Forced fumbles: 2
- Fumble recoveries: 2
- Pass deflections: 1
- Stats at Pro Football Reference

Stacy McGee (born January 17, 1990) is an American former professional football player who was a defensive end in the National Football League (NFL). He played college football for the Oklahoma Sooners and was selected by the Oakland Raiders in the sixth round of the 2013 NFL draft. McGee also played for the Washington Redskins, Carolina Panthers, and Arizona Cardinals.

== Professional career ==
Pre-draft measurables
Height	Weight	Arm length	Hand span	Wingspan
6 ft 3 1/4 in (1.91 m)	308 lb (140 kg)	34 1/2 in (0.88 m)	9 3/4 in (0.25 m)	6 ft 10 in (2.08 m)
All values from NFL Combine

=== Oakland Raiders ===
McGee was selected by the Oakland Raiders in the sixth round (205th overall) of the 2013 NFL draft.

=== Washington Redskins ===
On March 10, 2017, McGee signed a five-year contract with the Washington Redskins.

McGee was placed on the physically unable to perform to start the 2018 season while recovering from core muscle surgery. He was activated off PUP on November 6, 2018.

On March 13, 2019, McGee was released by the Redskins.

=== Carolina Panthers ===
On November 26, 2019, McGee signed with the Carolina Panthers.

=== Arizona Cardinals ===
On November 24, 2020, McGee was signed to the Arizona Cardinals' practice squad. He was elevated to the active roster on November 28 and January 2, 2021, for the team's weeks 12 and 17 games against the New England Patriots and Los Angeles Rams, and reverted to the practice squad after each game. His practice squad contract with the team expired after the season on January 11, 2021.
