= Greg Jenkins =

American football player (born 1989)

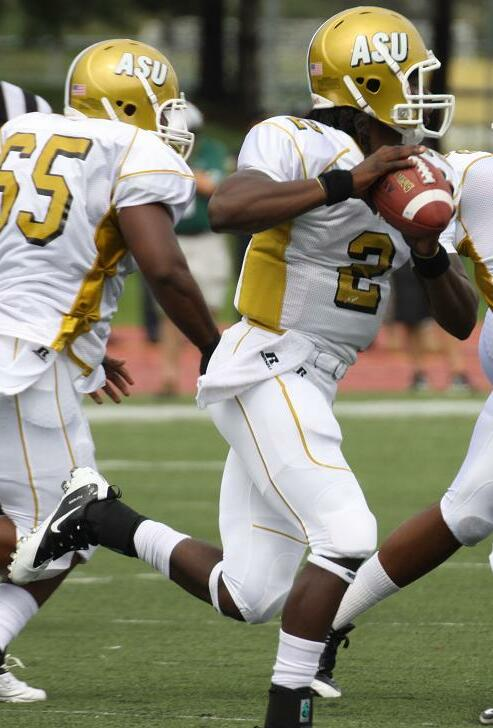
- Jenkins with Alabama State in 2011

No. 10, 12
- Position: Wide receiver

Personal information
- Born: August 23, 1989 (age 37); Dade City, Florida, U.S.
- Listed height: 6 ft 1 in (1.85 m)
- Listed weight: 208 lb (94 kg)

Career information
- High school: Wesley Chapel (FL)
- College: Alabama State (2008–2012)
- NFL draft: 2013: undrafted

Career history
- Oakland Raiders (2013–2014); Jacksonville Jaguars (2015)*; Hamilton Tiger-Cats (2017)*
- * Offseason or practice squad member only

Career NFL statistics
- Kick returns: 10
- Punt returns: 6
- Return yards: 270
- Fumble recoveries: 1
- Total touchdowns: 1
- Stats at Pro Football Reference

Greg Jenkins (born August 23, 1989) is an American former professional football player who was a wide receiver in the National Football League (NFL). He played college football as a quarterback for the Alabama State Hornets. He signed with the Oakland Raiders as an undrafted free agent immediately following the conclusion of the 2013 NFL draft. He was also a member of the Jacksonville Jaguars and Hamilton Tiger-Cats (CFL).

== College career ==
Jenkins played college football for Alabama State. While with the Hornets he played quarterback. In his senior year he threw for 1,691 yards, nine touchdowns, and ten interceptions while also rushing for 507 yards and eight touchdowns.

== Professional career ==
=== Oakland Raiders ===
Jenkins signed by Raiders as undrafted free agent on May 13, 2013. On November 23, 2013, he was promoted from the practice squad. On November 28, 2013 against the Dallas Cowboys in which he scored a fumble return touchdown on the opening kickoff. The Raiders waived/injured Jenkins on August 26, 2014.

=== Jacksonville Jaguars ===
Jenkins was signed by the Jaguars on July 24, 2015. He was released on an injury settlement by the Jaguars on September 2, 2015 in order to make room for Connor Hamlett to add tight end depth after an injury to starter Julius Thomas.

=== Hamilton Tiger-Cats ===
Greg Jenkins spent part of the 2017 Canadian Football League offseason trying to make the roster for the Hamilton Tiger-Cats before being released on May 1, 2017 as teams trimmed their rosters down to 75 players.
