= Tony Bergstrom =

American football player (born 1986)

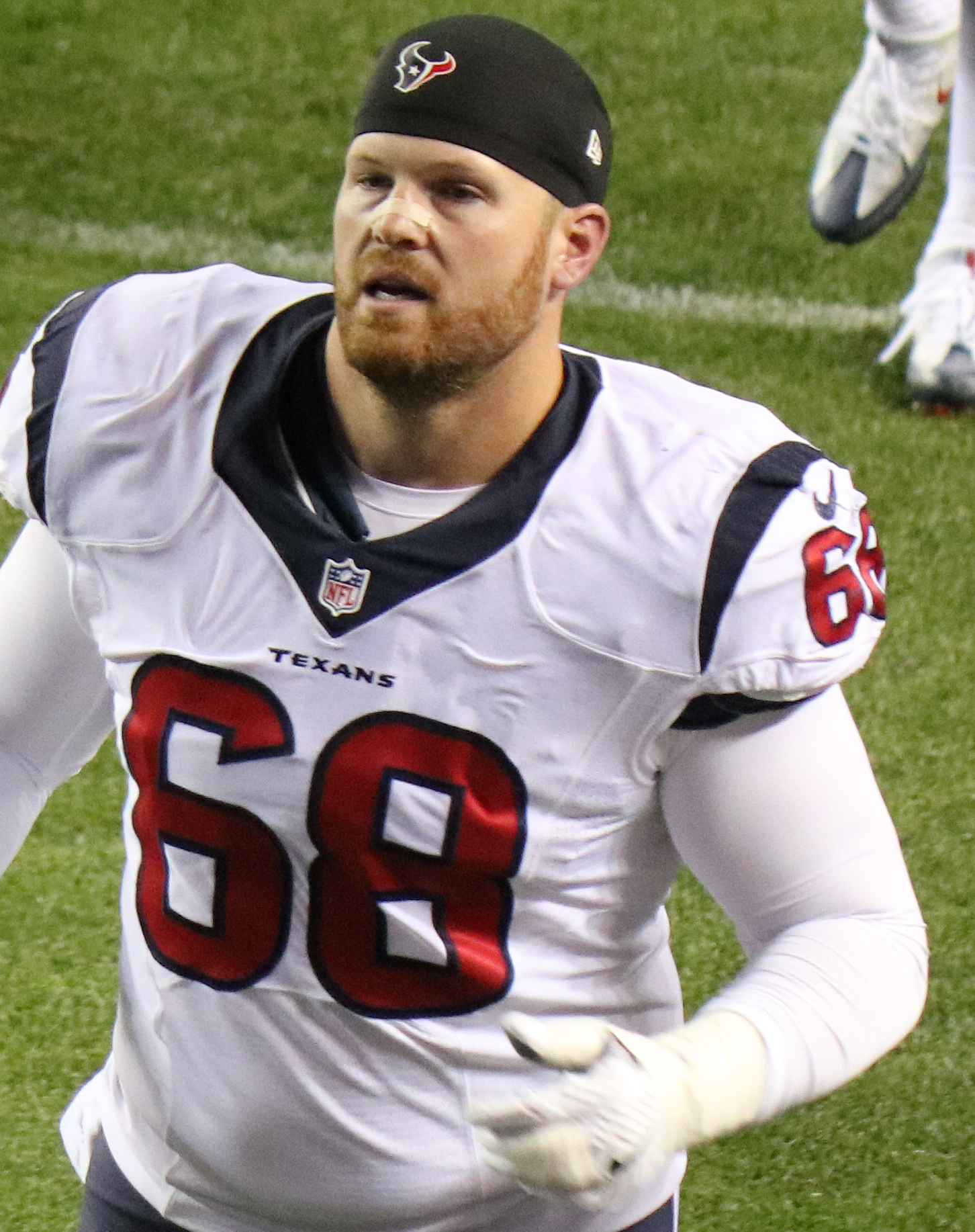
- Bergstrom with the Houston Texans in 2016

No. 70, 68, 66, 62
- Position: Center

Personal information
- Born: August 6, 1986 (age 40); Salt Lake City, Utah, U.S.
- Listed height: 6 ft 5 in (1.96 m)
- Listed weight: 310 lb (141 kg)

Career information
- High school: Skyline (Millcreek, Utah)
- College: Utah (2008-2011)
- NFL draft: 2012: 3rd round, 95th overall pick

Career history
- Oakland Raiders (2012–2015); Houston Texans (2016); Arizona Cardinals (2017)*; Baltimore Ravens (2017); Washington Redskins (2017–2019); San Francisco 49ers (2020)
- * Offseason or practice squad member only

Awards and highlights
- First-team All-Pac-12 (2011); Second-team All-Mountain West (2010)

Career NFL statistics
- Games played: 86
- Games started: 21
- Stats at Pro Football Reference

Anthony Steven Bergstrom (born August 6, 1986) is an American former professional football player who was a center in the National Football League (NFL). He played college football for the Utah Utes, and was selected by the Oakland Raiders in the third round of the 2012 NFL draft. He was also a member of the Houston Texans, Arizona Cardinals, Baltimore Ravens, Washington Redskins, and San Francisco 49ers.

== Early life ==
Bergstrom was a three-year starter and team captain on the powerhouse Skyline Eagles football team. It was there he gained the nickname, "The Man with the Silver Biceps." In 2002 and 2003 the Eagles made the state finals and in 2004 they were Regional champions and made the state semi-finals. Bergstrom was All-State and Region 3 Player of the Year in 2004 as well as the Eagles' Most Valuable Player. Throughout his high school career Bergstrom won many athletic and academic awards and nominations, including being a three-year High Honor Roll, an Academic All State, earning a College Board AP Scholar Award and being a National Football Foundation & College Hall of Fame 2004 Scholar-Leader-Athlete nominee. Bergstrom was also a three-year letterman in basketball and a two-year letterman in track and field.

== College career ==
=== 2008 ===
Bergstrom enrolled with the University of Utah in 2005 before departing on a LDS Church mission. He returned to school for the 2008 spring semester. He played in 10 games and started at left tackle against University of Nevada-Las Vegas, finishing with three knockdowns, two cuts and a pancake block. He also recorded two knockdowns and two cuts against Weber State and a pancake block against San Diego State. Bergstrom also saw action on special teams and was named Academic All-MWC and to the Athletic Director's Honor Roll.

=== 2009 ===
Bergstrom became the starting right tackle in 2009, leading the offensive line in total plays with 816 during the regular season. The coaches graded him at 81% on the year, with 662 wins of his 816 plays. He had 29 cuts and 12 pancake blocks for the season. His nine cuts against San Diego State was the best by a Ute all season and his highest grade of the year in a single game was 95% against fierce rivals BYU. He was also an Academic All-MWC.

=== 2010 ===
Bergstrom again started every game at right tackle and again led the offensive line in total plays with 584 in the 10 graded games. He did not allow a sack all season and he graded out at 84% on the season, winning 485 of his 584 plays. He had 14 cuts and two pancake blocks for the season. He again dominated San Diego State, winning 61-of-70 plays. He was voted to the Second-Team All-MWC.

=== 2011 ===
In 2011, Utah transferred to the Pac-12 conference and Bergstrom as team captain continued as the starting right tackle. He started in all 12 of the games he was fit, missing most of the rivalry game against BYU and the entire Washington game due to a knee injury. He led the Utes with an overall grade of 85% on the season, winning 546 of his 639 plays during the regular season. He was the best-graded Ute linemen in 6 games; earning 88% against Montana State, 91% against Oregon State University, 85% against University of Pittsburgh, 90% against University of California-Los Angeles, 89% against Washington State University and tied for the best grade with 92% against University of Colorado. He was named to the First-Team All-Pac-12 at the end of the season.

Bergstrom played 48 career games at Utah, starting 38 at right tackle.

=== 2012 Senior Bowl ===
Bergstrom was invited to the 2012 Senior Bowl. He played as a guard, the first time in his career that he has ever played the position.

== Professional career ==
Pre-draft measurables
Height	Weight	Arm length	Hand span	40-yard dash	10-yard split	20-yard shuttle	Three-cone drill	Vertical jump	Broad jump	Bench press
6 ft 5 3/8 in (1.97 m)	313 lb (142 kg)	32 in (0.81 m)	9 in (0.23 m)	5.19 s	1.81 s	4.84 s	7.95 s	29.5 in (0.75 m)	8 ft 5 in (2.57 m)	32 reps
All values from NFL Combine

=== Oakland Raiders ===
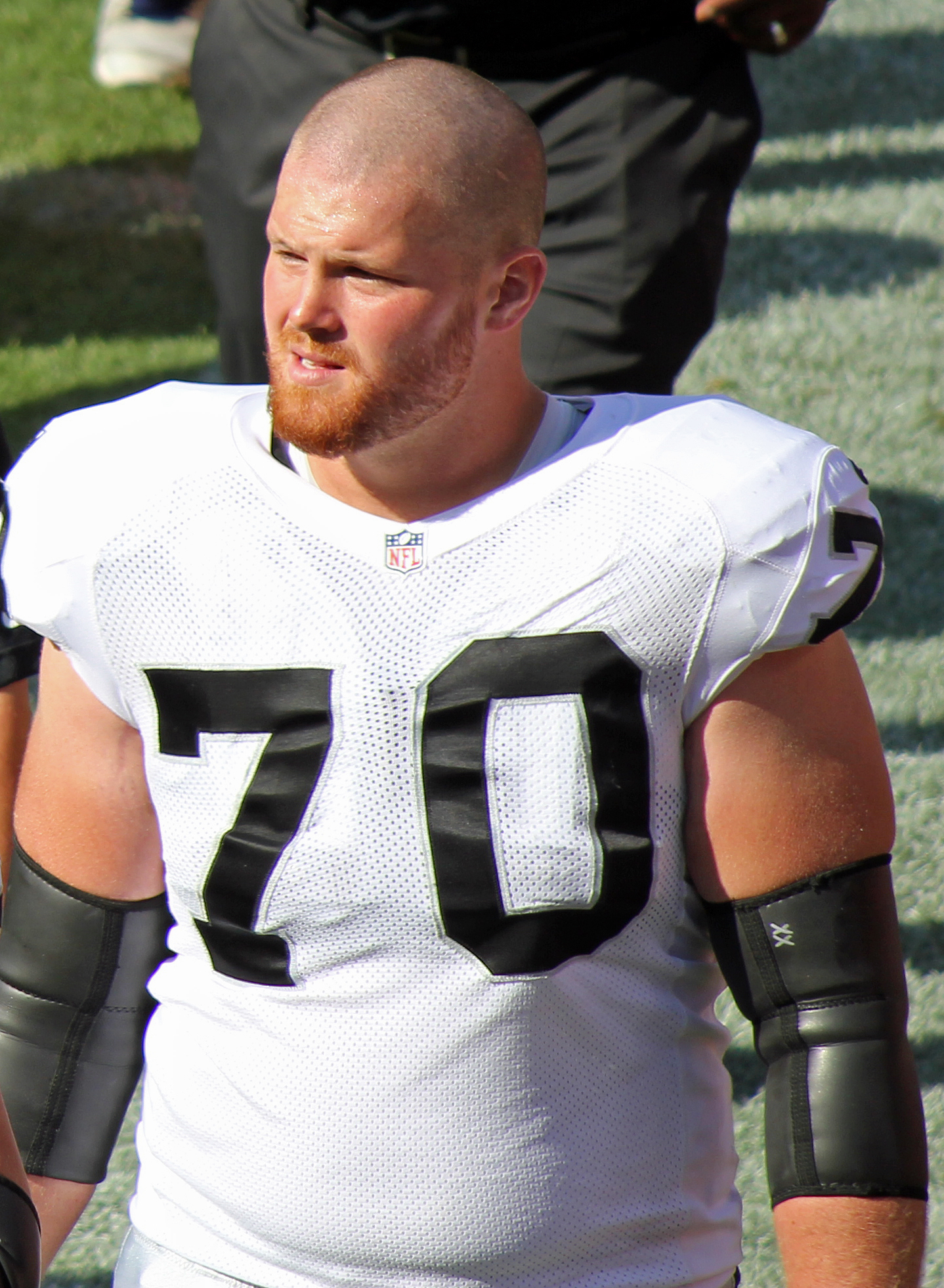
Bergstrom in 2012 with the Raiders.

Bergstrom was selected 95th overall in the 2012 NFL draft by the Oakland Raiders. As the Raiders had traded their first, second and third round picks in the draft, Bergstrom became their first pick at the end of the third round when he was taken with the Raiders' compensatory selection awarded to them for the loss of Nnamdi Asomugha in the 2011 Free Agency period.

Although a tackle throughout his college career, Bergstrom was drafted as a guard by the Raiders. Former Assistant Offensive Line Coach and former All-Pro guard Steve Wisniewski, who watched and interview Bergstrom at the 2012 Senior Bowl has been credited with discovering him.

=== Houston Texans ===
Bergstrom signed with the Houston Texans on March 9, 2016.

On April 13, 2017, he was released by the Texans.

=== Arizona Cardinals ===
On May 3, 2017, Bergstrom signed with the Arizona Cardinals.

=== Baltimore Ravens ===
On September 1, 2017 the Cardinals traded Bergstrom to the Baltimore Ravens for a conditional 2018 seventh round draft pick. He was released by the Ravens on October 19, 2017, but was re-signed two days later. He was released again on October 23, 2017.

=== Washington Redskins ===
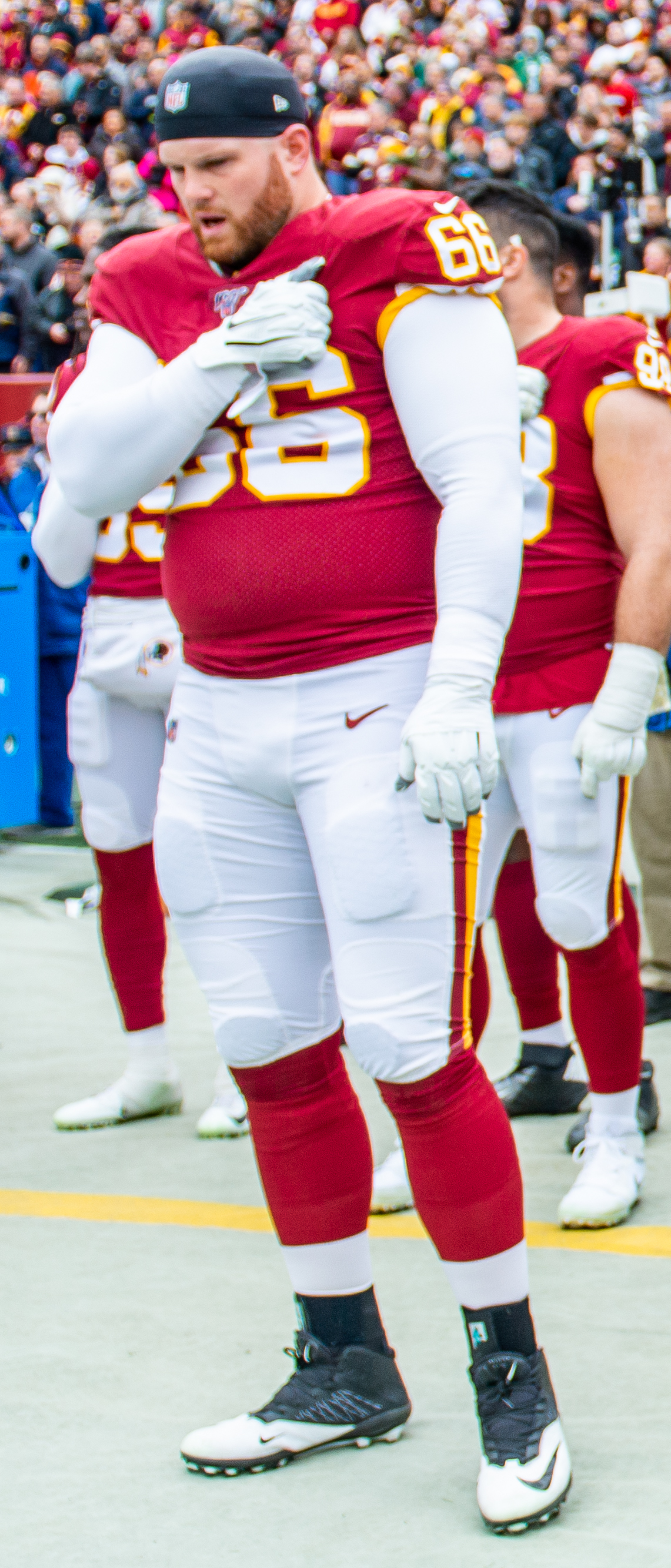
Bergstrom in a game against the New York Jets

On October 25, 2017, Bergstrom signed with the Washington Redskins. He played in 13 games in 2017, starting three at center. On April 16, 2018, Bergstrom re-signed with the team. He played in 13 games in 2018, starting 8. On April 24, 2019, Bergstrom re-signed with the Redskins.

=== San Francisco 49ers ===
On October 27, 2020, Bergstrom was signed to the San Francisco 49ers' practice squad. He was elevated to the active roster on November 5 and November 28 for the team's weeks 9 and 12 games against the Green Bay Packers and Los Angeles Rams, and reverted to the practice squad after each game. He was signed to the active roster on December 9, 2020.

== Personal life ==
Bergstorm is a member of the Church of Jesus Christ of Latter-day Saints.
