= Chance Casey =

American football player (born 1991)

No. 37
- Position: Cornerback

Personal information
- Born: March 11, 1991 (age 35); Southlake, Texas, U.S.
- Listed height: 5 ft 7 in (1.70 m)
- Listed weight: 112 lb (51 kg)

Career information
- College: Baylor
- NFL draft: 2013: undrafted

Career history
- Oakland Raiders (2013); San Francisco 49ers (2014)*; Oakland Raiders (2014); Indianapolis Colts (2015)*; Cleveland Browns (2015)*; Jacksonville Jaguars (2016)*
- * Offseason or practice squad member only

Awards and highlights
- 2009 ALL-BIG 12 Freshman; 2011 ALL-BIG 12 400-Meter Hurdler

Career NFL statistics
- Tackles: 7
- Interceptions: 0
- Passes defensed: 0
- Stats at Pro Football Reference

Chance Dylan Casey (born March 11, 1991) is an American former professional football player who was a cornerback in the National Football League (NFL). He played college football for the Baylor Bears, and signed with the Oakland Raiders as an undrafted free agent in 2013. Casey was also a member of the San Francisco 49ers, Indianapolis Colts, Cleveland Browns, and Jacksonville Jaguars.

== Professional career ==
On September 2, 2013, Casey was signed by the Oakland Raiders to the practice squad, after going undrafted in the 2013 NFL draft. On December 7, 2013, Casey was elevated to the active roster. On August 30, 2014, he was waived by the Raiders.

On September 1, 2014, Casey was signed to the 49ers practice squad. On September 15, 2014, he was released from the practice squad. On November 4, 2014, he was re-signed to the practice squad.

On December 16, 2014, Casey was signed from the 49ers practice squad. On May 11, 2015, he was waived by the Raiders.

On May 26, 2015, Casey was signed by the Colts. On September 5, 2015, he was waived by the Colts.

On October 28, 2015, Casey was signed by the Browns to the practice squad.

On February 16, 2016, Casey was signed by the Jacksonville Jaguars, and was waived by the team on May 11, 2016.
