= Menelik Watson =

English-born American football player (born 1988)

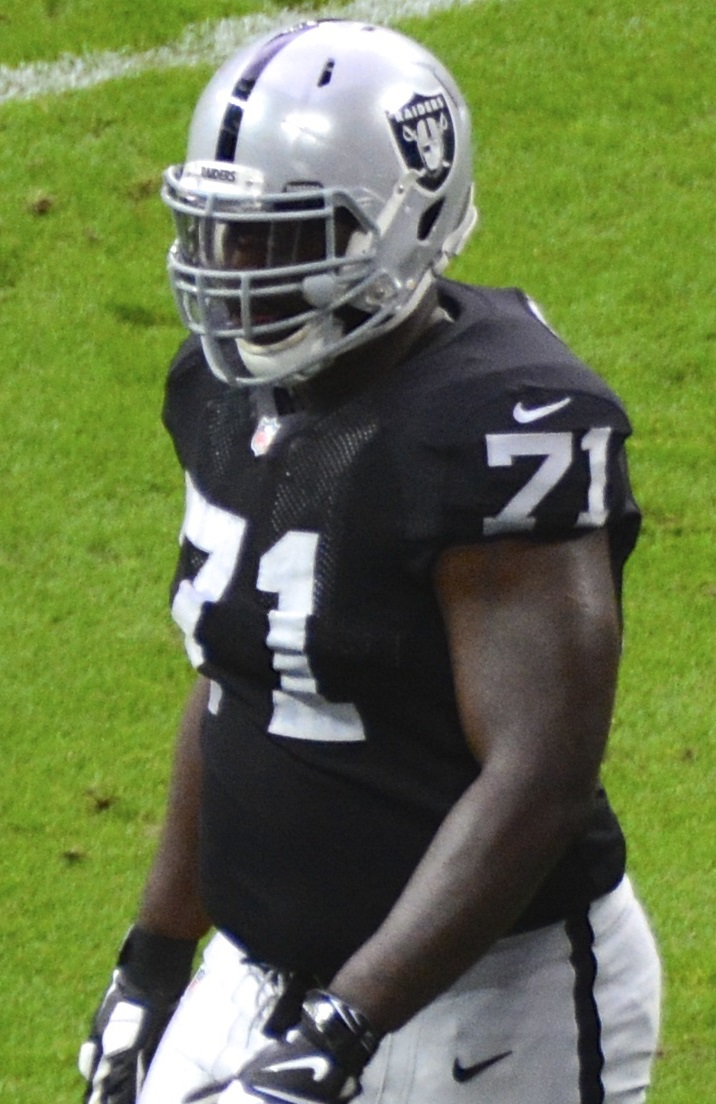
- Watson with the Oakland Raiders in 2014

No. 71, 75
- Position: Offensive tackle

Personal information
- Born: 22 December 1988 (age 37); Manchester, England
- Listed height: 6 ft 5 in (1.96 m)
- Listed weight: 315 lb (143 kg)

Career information
- High school: Burnage (Burnage, England)
- College: Saddleback (2011); Florida State (2012)
- NFL draft: 2013: 2nd round, 42nd overall pick

Career history
- Oakland Raiders (2013–2016); Denver Broncos (2017)

Career NFL statistics
- Games played: 34
- Games started: 24
- Stats at Pro Football Reference

Menelik Watson (born 22 December 1988) is an English former professional American football offensive tackle. He was selected by the Oakland Raiders in the second round of the 2013 NFL draft. He played college football for the Florida State Seminoles.

== Early life ==
Watson was born into a single-parent family of four brothers and a sister raised on the Anson Estate in Longsight, Greater Manchester, England; his mother, originally from Jamaica, worked as an office cleaner to support the family.

At Burnage High School, he excelled at sport. However, he broke his right ankle in 2001 while playing football in the park, meaning that he could not progress in his hopes of playing for Manchester City. Advised by a doctor not to play any more sports, he eventually joined the school basketball team, where he was spotted in a local tournament by American coach Rob Orellana, who signed him up for the Canarias Basketball Academy based in the Canary Islands.

== College career ==
Watson played college basketball for Marist College, which he attended from 2009 to 2010.

However, after it became clear that even at 6 feet 5 inches (1.96 m) Watson was too short to play power forward, Orellana transferred Watson to Saddleback College where he played American football for the first time. Watson played right tackle, opposite of left tackle Kyle Long. After a single year at Saddleback, he transferred to Florida State University, where he started 12 of 13 games for the Florida State Seminoles football team during the 2012 season, allowing just one quarterback sack.

After his 2012 season, Watson announced his decision to forego his senior season and enter the NFL Draft.

== Professional career ==
Pre-draft measurables
Height	Weight	Arm length	Hand span	40-yard dash	20-yard shuttle	Three-cone drill	Vertical jump	Broad jump
6 ft 5 in (1.96 m)	310 lb (141 kg)	34 in (0.86 m)	10 3/8 in (0.26 m)	5.29 s	5.01 s	8.31 s	24.5 in (0.62 m)	8 ft 7 in (2.62 m)
All values from NFL Combine.

=== Oakland Raiders ===
Watson was selected by the Oakland Raiders in the second round of the 2013 NFL draft with the 42nd overall pick.

Watson dressed for five games while starting for three of them in his rookie year.

On 28 September 2014, Watson was named Raiders' honorary captain for the International Series game against the Miami Dolphins, leading the Raiders out at Wembley Stadium.

In December 2014, Watson donated his game check to a four-year-old Oakland Raiders fan with Hypoplastic left heart syndrome, which is estimated to be around $18,000.

On 30 August 2015, Watson suffered a torn Achilles tendon during the third preseason game against the Arizona Cardinals. On 1 September 2015, the Raiders placed Watson on injured reserve.

=== Denver Broncos ===
On 10 March 2017, Watson signed a three-year contract with the Denver Broncos. He started the first seven games at right tackle before suffering a calf injury and was placed on injured reserve on 8 November 2017.

On 20 August 2018, Watson was placed on injured reserve with a pectoral injury. He was released on 8 September 2018.

== Personal life ==
Watson has a daughter Orellana—named in honour of his mentor Rob—who lives in Manchester with her mother.
