= Tony Sparano =

American football coach (1961–2018)

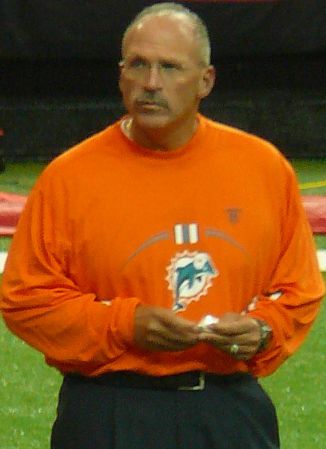
- Sparano with the Miami Dolphins in 2011

Personal information
- Born: October 7, 1961; West Haven, Connecticut, U.S.
- Died: July 22, 2018 (aged 56); Eden Prairie, Minnesota, U.S.

Career information
- High school: Lee (New Haven, Connecticut)
- College: New Haven

Career history
- New Haven (1984–1987) Offensive line coach; Boston University (1988) Offensive line coach; Boston University (1989–1993) Offensive coordinator; New Haven (1994–1998) Head coach; Cleveland Browns (1999) Offensive quality control coach; Cleveland Browns (2000) Offensive line coach; Washington Redskins (2001) Tight ends coach; Jacksonville Jaguars (2002) Tight ends coach; Dallas Cowboys (2003–2004) Tight ends coach; Dallas Cowboys (2005–2006) Offensive line coach & running game coordinator; Dallas Cowboys (2007) Assistant head coach & offensive line coach; Miami Dolphins (2008–2011) Head coach; New York Jets (2012) Offensive coordinator; Oakland Raiders (2013–2014) Assistant head coach & offensive line coach; Oakland Raiders (2014) Interim head coach; San Francisco 49ers (2015) Tight ends coach; Minnesota Vikings (2016–2017) Offensive line coach

Head coaching record
- Regular season: 41–14–1 (.745) (college); 32–41 (.438) (NFL)
- Postseason: 0–2 (.000) (college); 0–1 (.000) (NFL)
- Career: 41–16–1 (.719) (college); 32–42 (.432) (NFL)
- Coaching profile at Pro Football Reference

Anthony Joseph Sparano III (October 7, 1961 – July 22, 2018) was an American football coach. He served as the head coach of the Miami Dolphins and Oakland Raiders of the National Football League (NFL) and is the only NFL head coach to have led a team to the playoffs the year following a one-win season, and only the second to conduct a 10-game turnaround, both of which Sparano accomplished in his first season with the Dolphins. Sparano was fired by the Dolphins in December 2011 after a 4–9 start to the season, his worst start in his four-year tenure with the team.

Sparano was the offensive line coach for the Minnesota Vikings from 2016 until his death in July 2018.

== Playing career ==
Sparano was a four-year letterman for Division II University of New Haven, starting at center for the New Haven Chargers and graduating in 1982. He earned a B.S. in criminal justice from New Haven in 1984.

== Coaching career ==
=== College ===
Sparano began his coaching career at his alma mater, serving as New Haven's offensive line coach for four seasons before joining the staff at Division I-AA Boston University. After one year as the team's offensive line coach, Sparano served five seasons as the Terriers' offensive coordinator.

Sparano was named New Haven's head coach in 1994, and led the Chargers to two playoff appearances in five seasons. In 1997, New Haven led Division II in offense (42.8 points per game) and finished second in defense (11.6 points allowed per game) en route to a 12–2 record, losing to Northern Colorado in the championship game.

=== National Football League ===
==== Assistant coach ====
Beginning his NFL career in 1999, Sparano was fired in three staffing purges after brief stints with the Cleveland Browns, Washington Redskins and Jacksonville Jaguars.

Sparano was hired by new Dallas Cowboys coach Bill Parcells in 2003, rising from tight ends coach to assistant head coach in his five seasons in Dallas. Sparano was the offensive play-caller for Dallas in 2006, but ceded the responsibilities to new offensive coordinator Jason Garrett the following season.

==== Head coach ====
After firing Cam Cameron following a franchise-worst 1–15 season, the Miami Dolphins and new executive vice president of football operations, Bill Parcells hired Sparano to a four-year contract worth $2,500,000 per year on January 16, 2008.

In his first season, Sparano led the Dolphins to an 11–5 record and the AFC East division title, securing the franchise's first playoff berth in seven seasons before losing to the Baltimore Ravens in a wild-card game. Sparano is the first head coach to win a division title in their first season as head coach. The 10-win turnaround tied an NFL record and Sparano finished one vote behind Atlanta Falcons first-year head coach Mike Smith in balloting for the AP Coach of the Year award.

In the 2009 and 2010 seasons, Sparano led the Dolphins to a 7–9 record and third place in the AFC East. Sparano's Dolphins went 1–7 at home in 2010. The Dolphins were the subject of much gossip at the end of the 2010 season when team owner Stephen Ross flew across the country with General Manager Jeff Ireland to interview then Stanford University coach Jim Harbaugh. At the time of the interview with Harbaugh, Sparano was still the team's head coach. It was also reported by numerous media sources that Ross also spoke with former NFL coaches Jon Gruden and Bill Cowher about the not yet open position. According to reports Bill Cowher told Ross he would not talk to him while he had a head coach in place.

On January 8, 2011, the Dolphins gave Sparano a two-year extension worth $4.5 million, with Ross saying he was the perfect man for the job. However, on December 12, 2011, hours after a week 14 loss to the Philadelphia Eagles, Sparano was fired; secondary coach Todd Bowles finished out the season. The Dolphins bought out his contract for $9 million. Sparano is to date the last Dolphins head coach to lead them to a division title, as well as their last head coach with prior head coaching experience.

==== Return to assistant coaching ====
On January 11, 2012, Sparano was hired as the new offensive coordinator for the New York Jets, signing a three-year deal. Sparano was fired on January 7, 2013, after the Jets' offense performed extremely poorly, with an offense ranked 30th out of the 32 teams in the NFL.

On January 23, 2013, Sparano was hired to the dual roles of assistant head coach and offensive line coach by the Oakland Raiders. He was expected to work closely with new offensive coordinator Greg Olson and head coach Dennis Allen to restore the angle-blocking scheme favored by star running back Darren McFadden, following the Raiders' disappointing 2012 offensive showing. After an 0–4 start to the 2014 season, the Raiders fired Allen and promoted Sparano to interim head coach on September 30, 2014. Sparano was not retained under new head coach Jack Del Rio.

On January 22, 2015, the San Francisco 49ers announced Sparano would be their new tight ends coach under new head coach Jim Tomsula.

On January 13, 2016, the Minnesota Vikings announced Sparano would be their new offensive line coach. Sparano's final game before his death in July 2018 was the 2017 NFC Championship Game, where the Vikings would lose to the eventual Super Bowl champion Philadelphia Eagles 38–7.

== Personal life and death ==
Sparano was born in West Haven, Connecticut. He became known for wearing sunglasses, even during instances of relatively low lighting, due to an accident he suffered while working in a fast food restaurant at age 17 that damaged his eyesight and made sunglasses medically necessary.

Sparano and his wife, Jeanette, had three children: sons Anthony Michael (currently offensive line coach with the Indianapolis Colts) and Andrew (a tight ends coach with the Lamar University Cardinals) both played college football at Albany, while daughter Ryan Leigh is a classically trained French pastry chef.

On July 19, 2018, Sparano was hospitalized in Eden Prairie, Minnesota after suffering from chest pains. He was released the following day, but died two days later at age 56. Following an autopsy, it was confirmed that Sparano died of arteriosclerotic heart disease.

== Head coaching record ==
=== College ===
Year	Team	Overall	Conference	Standing	Bowl/playoffs	NCAA^{#}
New Haven Chargers (NCAA Division II independent) (1994–1998)
1994	New Haven	7–3				7
1995	New Haven	10–1–1			L NCAA Division II Quarterfinal	5
1996	New Haven	7–3				
1997	New Haven	12–2			L NCAA Division II Championship	2
1998	New Haven	5–5				
New Haven:		41–14–1				
Total:		41–14–1				
^{#}NCAA Division II Football Committee poll.

=== NFL ===
Team	Year	Regular season					Postseason			
Team	Year	Won	Lost	Ties	Win %	Finish	Won	Lost	Win %	Result
MIA	2008	11	5	0	.688	1st in AFC East	0	1	.000	Lost to Baltimore Ravens in AFC Wild Card game
MIA	2009	7	9	0	.438	3rd in AFC East	-	-	-	-
MIA	2010	7	9	0	.438	3rd in AFC East	-	-	-	-
MIA	2011	4	9	0	.308	Fired	-	-	-	
MIA total		29	32	0	.475		0	1	.000	
OAK*	2014	3	9	0	.250	4th in AFC West	-	-	-	
Total		32	41	0	.438		0	1	.000	

* – Interim head coach
