= Nick Kasa =

American football player (born 1990)

No. 88
- Position: Tight end

Personal information
- Born: November 5, 1990 (age 36); Rochester, New York, U.S.
- Listed height: 6 ft 6 in (1.98 m)
- Listed weight: 269 lb (122 kg)

Career information
- High school: Broomfield (CO) Legacy
- College: Colorado
- NFL draft: 2013: 6th round, 172nd overall pick

Career history
- Oakland Raiders (2013–2014); Denver Broncos (2015–2016)*
- * Offseason or practice squad member only

Awards and highlights
- Super Bowl champion (50)

Career NFL statistics
- Receptions: 1
- Receiving yards: 9
- Receiving touchdowns: 1
- Stats at Pro Football Reference

Nicholas Kasa (born November 5, 1990) is an American former professional football tight end who played in the National Football League (NFL). He played college football for the Colorado Buffaloes. He was selected by the Oakland Raiders in the sixth round of the 2013 NFL draft and was also a member of the Denver Broncos.

== Professional career ==
Pre-draft measurables
Height	Weight	Arm length	Hand span	40-yard dash	Vertical jump	Broad jump	Bench press
6 ft 6 in (1.98 m)	269 lb (122 kg)	32 7/8 in (0.84 m)	9 1/8 in (0.23 m)	4.71 s	31.5 in (0.80 m)	9 ft 5 in (2.87 m)	22 reps
All values from NFL Combine

=== Oakland Raiders ===
Kasa was selected by the Oakland Raiders in the sixth round with the 172nd overall pick in the 2013 NFL draft. He played in all 16 games during his rookie season. He caught his first and only NFL pass, a touchdown, in a Week 17 loss to the Denver Broncos with 37 seconds left in the game from Terrelle Pryor.

On August 12, 2014, Kasa tore his ACL. On August 26, 2014, Kasa was placed on injured reserve.

Kasa was released by the Raiders on May 5, 2015, after failing a team physical.

=== Denver Broncos ===
Kasa was signed to the Denver Broncos' practice squad on January 25, 2016. The Broncos used him in practice to imitate Greg Olsen, tight end for their Super Bowl 50 opponent, the Carolina Panthers. On February 7, 2016, Kasa was still part of the Broncos practice squad when the team won Super Bowl 50. In the game, the Broncos defeated the Carolina Panthers by a score of 24–10.

In July 2017, Kasa participated in The Spring League Showcase game.

== Personal life ==
Since September 2017, Kasa has worked in various companies in the Denver area. He currently works as principal account executive for cannabis at Bradsby Group.
