= 2012 Oakland Raiders season =

53rd season in franchise history

- Owner: Mark Davis
- General manager: Reggie McKenzie
- Head coach: Dennis Allen
- Home stadium: O.co Coliseum

Results
- Record: 4–12
- Division place: 3rd AFC West
- Playoffs: Did not qualify

Uniform
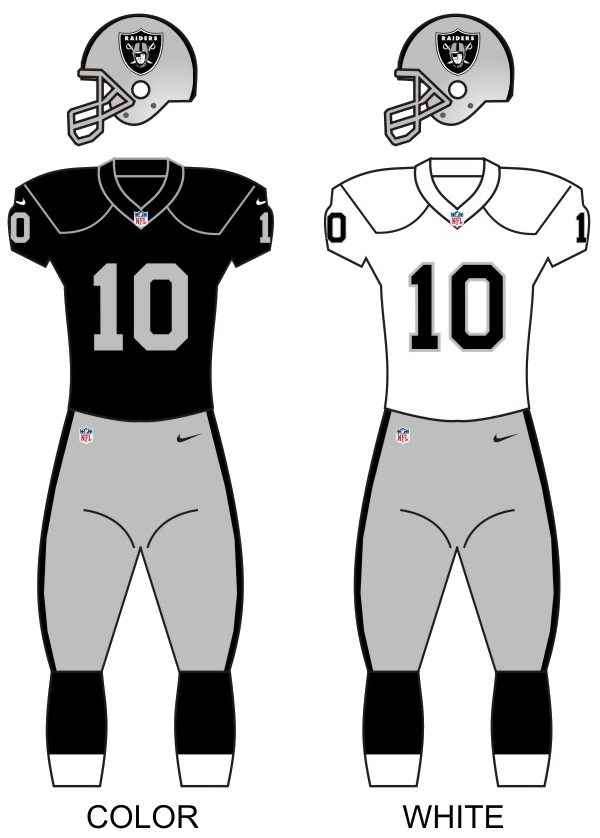

The 2012 season was the Oakland Raiders' 43rd in the National Football League (NFL), their 53rd overall, and their first season under head coach Dennis Allen after he replaced Hue Jackson, who was fired at the end of the previous season. It was also their first full season without the ownership of longtime owner Al Davis, who died on October 8, 2011, and the first season with a non-Davis family member as the general manager since 1972, as Reggie McKenzie was hired from the Green Bay Packers' organization by Al Davis' son Mark on January 10 to be the general manager of the team, and was given full autonomy over the football operations. McKenzie fired Jackson on his first day and hired Allen two weeks later. The Raiders failed to improve on their 8–8 record in 2011, securing them into their tenth consecutive non-winning season and the tenth consecutive elimination from postseason contention.

The Raiders also clinched their divisional rank, securing their fifth consecutive season since 2007 which they finished third or fourth. This was also the first time since the 2009 NFL season that the team finished with a record below 8–8.

== Personnel changes ==
- On January 3, local radio show – 95.7 The Game – reported that the Raiders had fired their entire defensive staff following a season with some of the worst defensive stats in franchise history. The radio show claimed that defensive coordinator Chuck Bresnahan had been fired along with all his assistants, among them linebackers coach Greg Biekert, cornerbacks coach Rod Woodson and safeties coach Aaron Ross. When approached for comment, then Raiders' senior executive John Herrera was quoted as saying ' that's not accurate '. On January 5, a follow-up report by NBC's Pro Football Talk reporter Gregg Rosenthal confirmed that the Raiders would be firing their entire defensive staff. The supposed earlier denial by John Herrera was clarified and that the Raiders had informed all of the concerned coaches that they would not be brought back, but would be required to complete the remaining two weeks of their contracts.

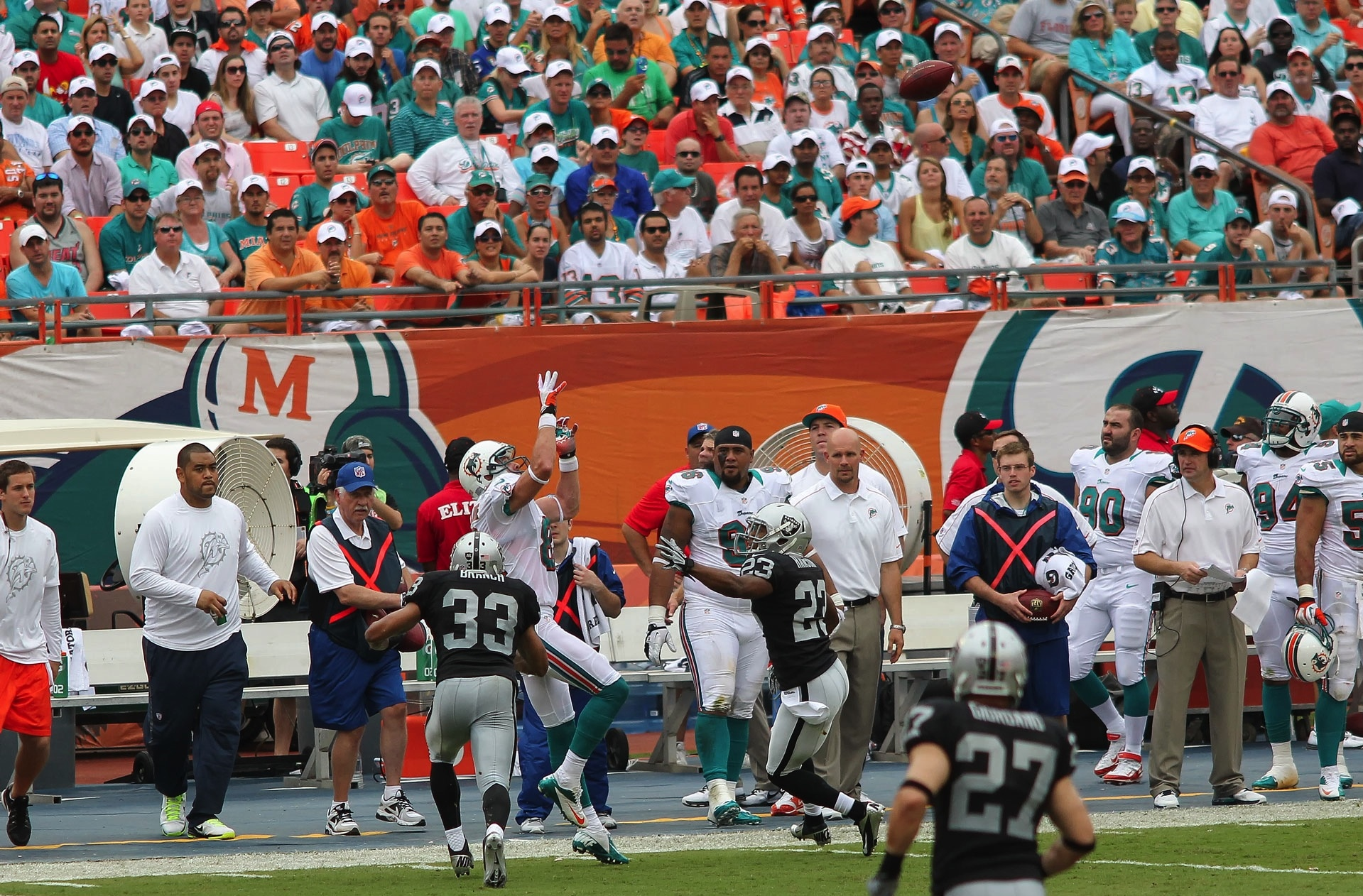
Oakland playing at the Miami Dolphins on September 16, 2012

- On January 6, the Raiders announced that then current Green Bay Packers director of football operations Reggie McKenzie, would become their new general manager. The hiring was confirmed at a news conference on January 10. McKenzie had spent 4 seasons with the then Los Angeles Raiders as a player from 1985 to 1988. He began his career as a front office executive with the Packers in 1994 as a Pro Personnel Assistant and steadily rose through the ranks, eventually overseeing all of the Packers' scouting efforts and player evaluations as well as being heavily involved in the Packers' drafting decisions. McKenzie will become the first person besides the late Al Davis to hold the position of general manager since Davis assumed the role in 1972.
- On January 10, at an official news conference introducing Reggie McKenzie as the new GM, McKenzie conducted his first act in the capacity of GM by announcing that the Raiders would be parting ways with Head Coach Hue Jackson after only one season in the job. Jackson had arrived in 2010 as the team's offensive coordinator under then head coach Tom Cable and swiftly turned the Raiders' offense into one of the league's highest-scoring offenses. Jackson was then promoted to the position of head coach after Al Davis had fired Tom Cable at the end of the 2010 season. McKenzie cited the need to start anew as the reason for firing Jackson, stating ' I felt there was a need for change at the head-coaching position, from the top. We're moving into a new era. No disrespect to Coach Jackson, but this was something I wanted to do, start anew. '
- On January 22, current Defensive Line coach Mike Waufle was allowed to leave the Raiders and take up the same position with the St. Louis Rams. Waufle had been a widely respected coach within the team and received regular praise from veteran defensive linemen Richard Seymour.
- On January 27, 3 days after the first reports were made, the Raiders officially announced Dennis Allen as their new head coach, replacing the fired Hue Jackson. Allen had been the current division rival Denver Broncos' defensive coordinator. At 39, Allen becomes one of the youngest Head Coaches in the league. As defensive coordinator he had helped turn the Broncos' worst-ranked defense into an aggressive, solid unit in 2011. Allen was signed to a four-year deal and becomes the first defensive-minded head coach hired by the Raiders since the hiring of legendary coach John Madden. GM Reggie McKenzie has promised Allen the freedom to pick and choose his own assistants and have a say on player signings and drafting, input that very few of the Raiders' head coaches had had in the Al Davis era.

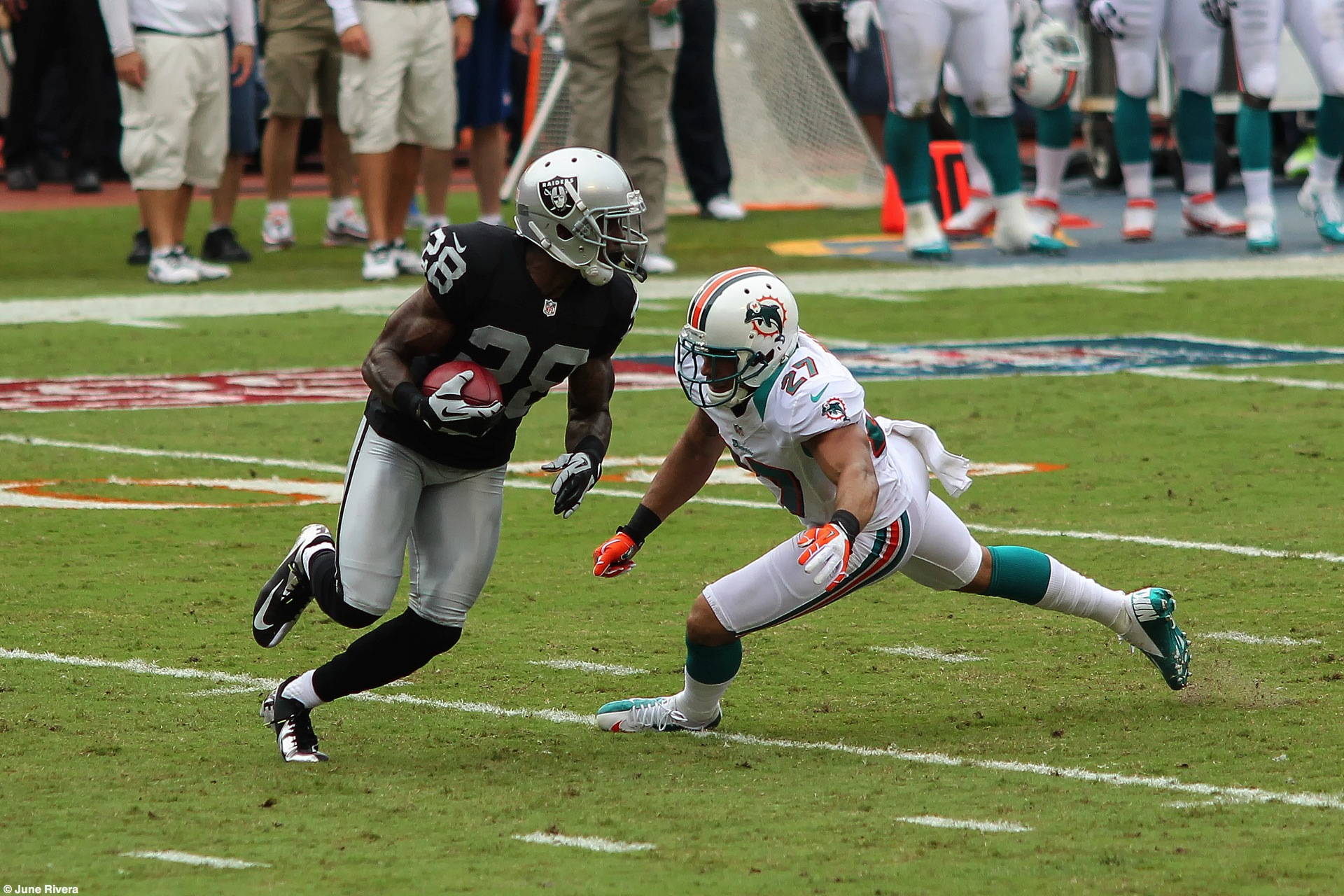
Raiders cornerback Phillip Adams runs with the ball against Miami, September 16

- On February 2, the Raiders announced the hiring of current Houston Texans' quarterbacks coach Greg Knapp as their new offensive coordinator. Knapp took over from Al Saunders, who was reassigned within the Raiders' coaching structure. Knapp had a previous stint with the Raiders in 2007 and 2008, where he helped the Raiders become one of the league's best rushing teams as they ranked 6th and 10th respectively. Knapp also became the first assistant coach to be hired by Allen in his capacity as head coach.
- On February 2, the Raiders hired Frank Pollack as their new offensive line coach. Pollack had previously coached the Houston Texans' offensive line for the past 5 seasons and helped create a rushing offense that had ranked in the top two over the past two seasons. Pollack is schooled in the Zone Blocking philosophy that the Raiders are looking to implement.
- On February 6, the Raiders announced the hiring of Jason Tarver as their new defensive coordinator and replacement for the fired Chuck Bresnahan. Tarver had previously spent a decade with the San Francisco 49ers as a defensive assistant before moving to Stanford, where he became a co-defensive coordinator and inside linebackers coach. During his time with the Cardinal, he coached on a defense that was ranked either 1st or 2nd in every major rush defense category.
- On February 8, the Raiders announced that veteran offensive coach Al Saunders would be staying with the team in his new role as Senior Offensive Assistant. Saunders, who had spent 2011 as the Raiders' Offensive Coordinator under Hue Jackson, was allowed to interview for other posts – notably for the Kansas City Chiefs' vacant Offensive Coordinator's job – but instead returned to the team.
- On February 14, the Raiders announced the hiring of six assistants; quarterbacks coach John DeFilippo – returning for his second stint with the Raiders -, defensive backs coaches Johnnie Lynn & Clayton Lopez, tight ends coach Mark Hutson, wide receivers coach Ted Gilmore and Defensive Line coach Terrell Williams. Hutson, Gilmore and Williams are all making their first coaching appearances in the NFL. Hutson had been a tight ends and offensive line coach at the collegiate level since 1990, recently working with Tulane. Gilmore had previously worked under ex-Raider Head Coach Lane Kiffin at USC, and Terrell Williams had been a defensive line coach and co-defensive coordinator for Texas A&M.
- On February 17, the Raiders and long-serving Senior Executive John Herrera agreed on a mutual separation. Herrera had joined the team in 1963 as an errand runner and would go on to hold a position of considerable power within the organisation that saw him oversee media and public relations as well as personnel and business decisions. He formed a close friendship with Al Davis over the years. Noted for being a controversial figure at times, he was characterised by his confrontational personality, culminating in a physical exchange with San Jose Mercury News columnist Tim Kawakami in 2008. Herrera later announced his retirement from football.

== Roster changes ==
=== Free agents ===
Position	Player	Tag	2012 Team	Notes
OT	Khalif Barnes	UFA	Oakland Raiders	re-signed March 21
OLB	Darryl Blackstock	UFA	Baltimore Ravens	
QB	Kyle Boller	UFA	TBD	
TE	Kevin Boss	Released	Kansas City Chiefs	signed with the Chiefs on March 16
SS	Tyvon Branch	Franchised	Oakland Raiders	assigned franchise tag on March 2, signed tender on May 7, signed four-year contract on July 14
DE	Mason Brodine	ERFA	Oakland Raiders	assigned tender on March 12, signed tender on April 2, cut on August 27
MLB/OLB	Ricky Brown	Released	Baltimore Ravens	
DT/DE	Desmond Bryant	RFA	Oakland Raiders	assigned tender on March 12, signed tender on June 6
RB	Michael Bush	UFA	Chicago Bears	signed with the Bears on March 22
QB	Jason Campbell	UFA	Chicago Bears	signed with the Bears on March 13
OG	Cooper Carlisle	Released	Oakland Raiders	released on March 14, re-signed on March 19
RB/ST	Rock Cartwright	UFA	San Francisco 49ers	signed with the 49ers on March 16
FS	Matt Giordano	UFA	Oakland Raiders	re-signed April 16
OLB	Quentin Groves	UFA	Arizona Cardinals	signed with the Cardinals on May 24
DT	John Henderson	Released	TBD	
OT/OG	Stephon Heyer	UFA	New York Jets	signed with the Jets on May 29
WR	T. J. Houshmandzadeh	UFA	TBD	
DB/ST	Bryan McCann	ERFA	Oakland Raiders	assigned tender on March 12, signed tender on April 2
DE/OLB	Jarvis Moss	UFA	TBD	
FB	Marcel Reece	ERFA	Oakland Raiders	assigned tender on March 12, signed tender on June 4
CB	Stanford Routt	Released	Kansas City Chiefs	signed with the Chiefs on February 20
C	Samson Satele	UFA	Indianapolis Colts	signed with the Colts on March 21
WR	Chaz Schilens	UFA	New York Jets	signed with the Jets on March 16
DE/OLB	Trevor Scott	UFA	New England Patriots	signed with the Patriots on March 19
CB	Lito Sheppard	UFA	TBD	
OLB/DE	Kamerion Wimbley	Released	Tennessee Titans	signed with the Titans on March 20

Player re-signed by the Raiders

=== Signings ===
Position	Player	Tag	2011 team	Notes
CB	Ron Bartell	UFA	St. Louis Rams	signed to a one-year contract on March 16
LB	Korey Bosworth	UFA	Detroit Lions(2012)	signed on August 16, cut on August 27
OG	Mike Brisiel	UFA	Houston Texans	signed to a five-year contract on March 16
WR	Duke Calhoun	UFA	New York Giants	signed on April 20, placed on injured reserve
P/K	Eddy Carmona	UDFA	–	signed on May 14 after participating as a tryout during the rookie mini-camp, waived on August 31
DE	Wayne Dorsey	UDFA	–	signed on May 14 after participating as a tryout during the rookie mini-camp, cut on August 27
TE	Kyle Efaw	UDFA	–	signed on May 14 after participating as a tryout during the rookie mini-camp, waived on August 31
CB	Coye Francies	UFA	Seattle Seahawks(2012)	claimed off waivers on August 29
CB	Joselio Hanson	UFA	Philadelphia Eagles(2012)	signed on September 3
TE	Andre Hardy	UFA	–	signed on April 12, waived on May 14
OT	Kevin Haslam	UFA	Jacksonville Jaguars	signed on May 14 after participating as a tryout during the rookie mini-camp, waived on August 31
OT	Nick Howell	UFA	New Orleans Saints(2012)	signed on June 8, waived on August 31
TE	Tory Humphrey	UFA	New Orleans Saints	signed on June 12, waived-placed on injured reserve on August 31
CB	Pat Lee	UFA	Green Bay Packers	signed to a one-year contract on March 21
QB	Matt Leinart	UFA	Houston Texans	signed to a one-year contract on May 1
CB	LeQuan Lewis	UFA	–	signed on May 14 after participating as a tryout during the rookie mini-camp, released on June 22
C	Colin Miller	UFA	–	signed on May 8, waived on August 31, added to practice squad on September 2
QB	Kyle Newhall-Caballero	UDFA	–	signed on May 22, cut on August 27
WR/RS	Roscoe Parrish	UFA	San Diego Chargers(2012)	signed on August 28, cut on August 31
FB	TréShawn Robinson	UDFA	–	signed on May 14 after participating as a tryout during the rookie mini-camp, released on June 8
FB	Owen Schmitt	UFA	Philadelphia Eagles	signed to a one-year contract on May 15
WR	Travionte Session	UDFA	–	signed on May 14 after participating as a tryout during the rookie mini-camp, waived on August 31, added to practice squad on September 2
CB	Shawntae Spencer	UFA	San Francisco 49ers	signed to a one-year contract on March 19
DE/OLB	Dave Tollefson	UFA	New York Giants	signed to a two-year contract on April 6
OT	Ed Wang	UFA	–	signed on May 2, waived-injured on August 27, placed on injured reserve on August 29
OLB	Philip Wheeler	UFA	Indianapolis Colts	signed to a one-year contract on March 30

=== Trades ===
- On March 30, the Raiders traded offensive lineman Bruce Campbell to the Carolina Panthers in exchange for running back/kickoff returner Mike Goodson. The deal came about due to the Raiders' need to fill the void left behind after the departure of Michael Bush in Free Agency.
- On July 23, the Raiders traded wide receiver Louis Murphy to the Carolina Panthers for a conditional late round draft pick.

=== 2012 draft class ===
The Raiders did not have first-, second-, third-, fourth- or seventh-round selections heading into the 2012 NFL draft due to the following trades:

- Their first-round selection and a conditional 2013 selection were traded to the Cincinnati Bengals in exchange for QB Carson Palmer.
- Their second-round selection and a 2011 seventh-round selection were traded to the New England Patriots in exchange for third and fourth-round selections in 2011.
- Their third-round selection was forfeited after selecting QB Terrelle Pryor in the 2011 Supplemental Draft.
- Their fourth-round selection was traded to the Washington Redskins in exchange for QB Jason Campbell.
- Their seventh-round selection and a conditional 2013 selection were traded to the Seattle Seahawks in exchange for LB Aaron Curry.

== Draft ==
2012 Oakland Raiders draft
Round	Pick	Player	Position	College	Notes
3	95	Tony Bergstrom	G	Utah	
4	129	Miles Burris	LB	San Diego State	
5	158	Jack Crawford	DE	Penn State	from Detroit
5	168	Juron Criner	WR	Arizona	
6	189	Christo Bilukidi	DT	Georgia State	
7	230	Nathan Stupar	OLB	Penn State	from Detroit
Made roster † Pro Football Hall of Fame * Made at least one Pro Bowl during career

=== Undrafted free agents ===
All undrafted free agents were signed following the conclusion of the 2012 NFL draft on April 28.

Position	Player	College	Notes
CB	Conroy Black	Utah	Added to the team roster on May 10, partook in rookie mini-camp, waived on August 28
LB	Kaelin Burnett	Nevada	Added to the team roster on May 10, partook in rookie mini-camp, waived on August 31, added to practice squad on September 2
WR/TE	Derek Carrier	Beloit	Added to the team roster on May 10, partook in rookie mini-camp, waived on August 31
WR	Brandon Carswell	USC	Added to the team roster on May 10, partook in rookie mini-camp, waived on August 31, added to practice squad on September 2
CB	Corey Gatewood	Stanford	
DT	Raphael Guidry	Kansas State	
DT	Dominique Hamilton	Missouri	Added to the team roster on May 10, partook in rookie mini-camp, waived on August 31
S	Aaron Henry	Wisconsin	Added to the team roster on May 10, partook in rookie mini-camp, cut on August 27
LB	Chad Kilgore	Northwest Missouri	Signed on July 29, waived on August 31,
P	Marquette King	Fort Valley State	Added to the team roster on May 10, partook in rookie mini-camp, placed on injured reserve on August 31,
OT	Dan Knapp	Arizona State	Added to the team roster on May 10, will participate in rookie mini-camp, waived on August 31,
LB	Mario Kurn	San Diego	Added to the team roster on May 10, partook in rookie mini-camp, placed on injured reserve
WR	Thomas Mayo	Cal (PA)	Added to the team roster on May 10, partook in rookie mini-camp, cut on August 27
WR	DeAundre Muhammad	Indiana	Signed on July 29, cut on August 27
DE	Darius Nall	UCF	
OG	Lucas Nix	Pitt	Added to the team roster on May 10, partook in rookie mini-camp
CB	Chaz Powell	Penn State	Added to the team roster on May 10, partook in rookie mini-camp, cut on August 27
WR	Rod Streater	Temple	Added to the team roster on May 10, partook in rookie mini-camp

== Staff ==
2012 Oakland Raiders staff
Front office: Owner – Mark Davis; Chief executive – Amy Trask; General manager – Reggie McKenzie; Director of football administration – Tom Delaney; Director of player personnel – Joey Clinkscales; Director of college scouting – Shaun Herock; Head coaches: Head coach – Dennis Allen; Offensive coaches: Offensive coordinator – Greg Knapp; Senior offensive assistant – Al Saunders; Quarterbacks – John DeFilippo; Running backs – Kelly Skipper; Wide receivers – Ted Gilmore; Tight ends – Mark Hutson; Offensive line – Frank Pollack; Quality control/offense – Justin Griffith; Offensive assistant – Nick Holz	Defensive coaches: Defensive coordinator – Jason Tarver; Defensive line – Terrell Williams; Linebackers – Johnny Holland; Defensive backs – Clayton Lopez; Defensive backs – Johnnie Lynn; Quality control/defense – Eric Sanders; Defensive assistant – Travis Smith; Special teams coaches: Special teams coordinator – Steve Hoffman; Assistant special teams – Keith Burns; Strength and conditioning: Strength and conditioning – Al Miller; Assistant strength and conditioning – John Grieco

== Final roster ==
2012 Oakland Raiders roster
Quarterbacks (QB): 7 Matt Leinart; 3 Carson Palmer; 6 Terrelle Pryor; Running backs (RB): 25 Mike Goodson; 22 Taiwan Jones; 20 Darren McFadden; 49 Jamize Olawale FB; 45 Marcel Reece FB; 32 Jeremy Stewart; Wide receivers (WR): 84 Juron Criner; 10 Derek Hagan; 85 Darrius Heyward-Bey; 17 Denarius Moore; 80 Rod Streater; Tight ends (TE): 86 David Ausberry; 82 Richard Gordon; 83 Brandon Myers	Offensive linemen (OL): 69 Khalif Barnes T; 70 Tony Bergstrom G; 65 Mike Brisiel G; 66 Cooper Carlisle G; 76 Lucas Nix G; 67 Alex Parsons C/G; 79 Willie Smith T; 68 Jared Veldheer T; 61 Stefen Wisniewski C; Defensive linemen (DL): 75 Brandon Bair DE; 96 Christo Bilukidi DT; 90 Desmond Bryant DT; 97 Andre Carter DE; 91 Jack Crawford DE; 99 Lamarr Houston DE; 93 Tommy Kelly DT; 77 Matt Shaughnessy DE	Linebackers (LB): 95 Kaelin Burnett OLB; 56 Miles Burris OLB; 57 Keenan Clayton OLB; 53 Omar Gaither MLB; 55 Rolando McClain MLB; 58 Dave Tollefson OLB; 52 Philip Wheeler OLB; Defensive backs (DB): 33 Tyvon Branch SS; 35 Chimdi Chekwa CB; 31 Coye Francies CB; 27 Matt Giordano FS; 23 Joselio Hanson CB; 24 Michael Huff FS/CB; 34 Mike Mitchell SS; 38 Cory Nelms CB; 29 Brandian Ross CB; Special teams (ST): 59 Jon Condo LS; 11 Sebastian Janikowski K; 9 Shane Lechler P	Practice squad: 62 Jason Foster G; 49 Jerrell Harris LB; 37 Akwasi Owusu-Ansah CB; 87 Travionte Session WR; 47 Mickey Shuler TE; 63 Jason Slowey C; Reserve: 28 Phillip Adams CB (IR); 14 Duke Calhoun WR (IR); 12 Jacoby Ford WR (IR); 50 Travis Goethel MLB (IR); 78 Zach Hurd T (IR); 2 Marquette King P (IR); 49 Mario Kurn OLB (IR); 92 Richard Seymour DT (IR); 36 Shawntae Spencer CB (IR); Rookies in italics 53 active, 9 reserve, 6 practice squad

== Schedule ==
=== Preseason ===
Week	Date	Opponent	Result	Record	Venue	NFL.com recap
1	August 13	Dallas Cowboys	**L** 0–3	0–1	O.co Coliseum	Recap
2	August 17	at Arizona Cardinals	**L** 27–31	0–2	University of Phoenix Stadium	Recap
3	August 25	Detroit Lions	**W** 31–20	1–2	O.co Coliseum	Recap
4	August 30	at Seattle Seahawks	**L** 3–21	1–3	CenturyLink Field	Recap

=== Regular season ===
Week	Date	Opponent	Result	Record	Venue	NFL.com recap
1	September 10	**San Diego Chargers**	**L** 14–22	0–1	O.co Coliseum	Recap
2	September 16	at Miami Dolphins	**L** 13–35	0–2	Sun Life Stadium	Recap
3	September 23	Pittsburgh Steelers	**W** 34–31	1–2	O.co Coliseum	Recap
4	September 30	at **Denver Broncos**	**L** 6–37	1–3	Sports Authority Field at Mile High	Recap
5	Bye					
6	October 14	at Atlanta Falcons	**L** 20–23	1–4	Georgia Dome	Recap
7	October 21	Jacksonville Jaguars	**W** 26–23 (OT)	2–4	O.co Coliseum	Recap
8	October 28	at **Kansas City Chiefs**	**W** 26–16	3–4	Arrowhead Stadium	Recap
9	November 4	Tampa Bay Buccaneers	**L** 32–42	3–5	O.co Coliseum	Recap
10	November 11	at Baltimore Ravens	**L** 20–55	3–6	M&T Bank Stadium	Recap
11	November 18	New Orleans Saints	**L** 17–38	3–7	O.co Coliseum	Recap
12	November 25	at Cincinnati Bengals	**L** 10–34	3–8	Paul Brown Stadium	Recap
13	December 2	Cleveland Browns	**L** 17–20	3–9	O.co Coliseum	Recap
14	December 6	**Denver Broncos**	**L** 13–26	3–10	O.co Coliseum	Recap
15	December 16	**Kansas City Chiefs**	**W** 15–0	4–10	O.co Coliseum	Recap
16	December 23	at Carolina Panthers	**L** 6–17	4–11	Bank of America Stadium	Recap
17	December 30	at **San Diego Chargers**	**L** 21–24	4–12	Qualcomm Stadium	Recap

Note: Intra-division opponents are in bold text.

=== Game summaries ===
==== Week 1: vs. San Diego Chargers ====
Week One: San Diego Chargers at Oakland Raiders – Game summary

Quarter	1	2	3	4	Total
**Chargers**	3	7	6	6	**22**
Raiders	3	3	0	8	**14**

at O.co Coliseum, Oakland, California

- Date: September 10
- Game time: 7:15 p.m. PDT
- Game weather: 67 °F (19 °C), sunny
- Game attendance: 61,896
- Referee: Jim Core
- TV announcers (ESPN): Chris Berman, Trent Dilfer and Rachel Nichols

Game information

**First quarter**

- OAK – Sebastian Janikowski 51-yard field goal, 4:56. Raiders 3–0. **Drive: 7 plays, 33 yards, 2:55.**
- SD – Nate Kaeding 23-yard field goal, 1:00. Tied 3–3. **Drive: 9 plays, 74 yards, 3:56.**

**Second quarter**

- SD – Malcom Floyd 6-yard pass from Philip Rivers (Nate Kaeding kick), 3:10. Chargers 10–3. **Drive: 13 plays, 90 yards, 8:06.**
- OAK – Sebastian Janikowski 19-yard field goal, 0:04. Chargers 10–6. **Drive: 14 plays, 78 yards, 3:06.**

**Third quarter**

- SD – Nate Kaeding 28-yard field goal, 6:01. Chargers 13–6. **Drive: 7 plays, 29 yards, 2:42.**
- SD – Nate Kaeding 19-yard field goal, 1:49. Chargers 16–6. **Drive: 4 plays, 7 yards, 2:31.**

**Fourth quarter**

- SD – Nate Kaeding 41-yard field goal, 12:48. Chargers 19–6. **Drive: 9 plays, 32 yards, 3:02.**
- SD – Nate Kaeding 45-yard field goal, 5:06. Chargers 22–6. **Drive: 8 plays, 15 yards, 4:46.**
- OAK – Rod Streater 2-yard pass from Carson Palmer (Carson Palmer-Rod Streater pass), 0:54. Chargers 22–14. **Drive: 12 plays, 80 yards, 4:12.**

**Top passers**

- SD – Philip Rivers – 24/33, 231 yards, TD
- OAK – Carson Palmer – 32/46, 297 yards, TD

**Top rushers**

- SD – Eddie Royal – 2 rushes, 12 yards
- OAK – Darren McFadden – 15 rushes, 32 yards

**Top receivers**

- SD – Malcom Floyd – 4 receptions, 66 yards, TD
- OAK – Darren McFadden – 13 receptions, 86 yards

With the loss, the Raiders began their season 0–1.

==== Week 2: at Miami Dolphins ====
Week Two: Oakland Raiders at Miami Dolphins – Game summary

Quarter	1	2	3	4	Total
Raiders	7	3	0	3	**13**
**Dolphins**	7	0	14	14	**35**

at Sun Life Stadium, Miami Gardens, Florida

- Date: September 16
- Game time: 1:00 p.m. EDT/10:00 a.m. PDT
- Game weather: 80 °F (27 °C), cloudy
- Game attendance: 54,245
- Referee: Mike Shepherd
- TV announcers (CBS): Kevin Harlan and Solomon Wilcots

Game information

**First quarter**

- MIA – Ryan Tannehill 2-yard run (Dan Carpenter kick), 9:19. Dolphins 7–0. **Drive: 12 plays, 80 yards, 5:41.**
- OAK – Mike Goodson 64-yard pass from Carson Palmer (Sebastian Janikowski kick), 0:11. Tied 7–7. **Drive: 6 plays, 92 yards, 3:17.**

**Second quarter**

- OAK – Sebastian Janikowski 25-yard field goal, 0:46. Raiders 10–7. **Drive: 12 plays, 81 yards, 2:47.**

**Third quarter**

- MIA – Reggie Bush 23-yard run (Dan Carpenter kick), 7:57. Dolphins 14–10. **Drive: 4 plays, 44 yards, 1:37.**
- MIA – Reggie Bush 65-yard run (Dan Carpenter kick), 3:52. Dolphins 21–10. **Drive: 3 plays, 80 yards, 1:22.**

**Fourth quarter**

- OAK – Sebastian Janikowski 27-yard field goal, 14:50. Dolphins 21–13. **Drive: 5 plays, 15 yards, 1:25.**
- MIA – Anthony Fasano 14-yard pass from Ryan Tannehill (Dan Carpenter kick), 11:45. Dolphins 28–13. **Drive: 8 plays, 80 yards, 3:05.**
- MIA – Lamar Miller 15-yard run (Dan Carpenter kick), 5:06. Dolphins 35–13. **Drive: 8 plays, 75 yards, 5:18.**

**Top passers**

- OAK – Carson Palmer – 24/48, 373 yards, TD, INT
- MIA – Ryan Tannehill – 18/30, 200 yards, TD

**Top rushers**

- OAK – Darren McFadden – 11 rushes, 22 yards
- MIA – Reggie Bush – 26 rushes, 172 yards, 2 TD

**Top receivers**

- OAK – Brandon Myers – 6 receptions, 86 yards
- MIA – Brian Hartline – 9 receptions, 111 yards

With the loss, the Raiders fell to 0–2.

==== Week 3: vs. Pittsburgh Steelers ====
Week Three: Pittsburgh Steelers at Oakland Raiders – Game summary

Quarter	1	2	3	4	Total
Steelers	14	3	14	0	**31**
**Raiders**	7	7	7	13	**34**

at O.co Coliseum, Oakland, California

- Date: September 23
- Game time: 1:25 p.m. PDT
- Game weather: 69 °F (21 °C), cloudy
- Game attendance: 62,373
- Referee: David White
- TV announcers (CBS): Ian Eagle and Dan Fouts

Game information

**First quarter**

- PIT – Heath Miller 4-yard pass from Ben Roethlisberger (Shaun Suisham kick), 11:33. Steelers 7–0. **Drive: 7 plays, 36 yards, 3:01.**
- OAK – Darren McFadden 64-yard run (Sebastian Janikowski kick), 10:33. Tied 7–7. **Drive: 3 plays, 80 yards, 1:00.**
- PIT – Heath Miller 4-yard pass from Ben Roethlisberger (Shaun Suisham kick), 3:49. Steelers 14–7. **Drive: 12 plays, 81 yards, 6:44.**

**Second quarter**

- OAK – Darrius Heyward-Bey 3-yard pass from Carson Palmer (Sebastian Janikowski kick), 1:54. Tied 14–14. **Drive: 6 plays, 30 yards, 2:26.**
- PIT – Shaun Suisham 33-yard field goal, 0:00. Steelers 17–14. **Drive: 9 plays, 64 yards, 1:54.**

**Third quarter**

- PIT – Mike Wallace 22-yard pass from Ben Roethlisberger (Shaun Suisham kick), 11:40. Steelers 24–14. **Drive: 9 plays, 80 yards, 3:20.**
- OAK – Richard Gordon 1-yard pass from Carson Palmer (Sebastian Janikowski kick), 6:35. Steelers 24–21. **Drive: 10 plays, 48 yards, 5:05.**
- PIT – Antonio Brown 11-yard pass from Ben Roethlisberger (Shaun Suisham kick), 1:31. Steelers 31–21. **Drive: 8 plays, 48 yards, 5:05.**

**Fourth quarter**

- OAK – Denarius Moore 6-yard pass from Carson Palmer (Sebastian Janikowski kick), 12:13. Steelers 31–28. **Drive: 11 plays, 80 yards, 4:18.**
- OAK – Sebastian Janikowski 32-yard field goal, 6:30. Tied 31–31. **Drive: 9 plays, 50 yards, 4:15.**
- OAK – Sebastian Janikowski 43-yard field goal, 0:00. Raiders 34–31. **Drive: 9 plays, 49 yards, 1:43.**

**Top passers**

- PIT – Ben Roethlisberger – 36/49, 384 yards, 4 TD
- OAK – Carson Palmer – 24/34, 209 yards, 3 TD, INT

**Top rushers**

- PIT – Isaac Redman – 9 rushes, 27 yards
- OAK – Darren McFadden – 18 rushes, 113 yards, TD

**Top receivers**

- PIT – Mike Wallace – 8 receptions, 123 yards, TD
- OAK – Brandon Myers – 4 receptions, 55 yards

With the win, the Raiders improved to 1–2. The Pittsburgh Steelers would end up being the only AFC North team Oakland defeated during the 2012 season.

==== Week 4: at Denver Broncos ====
Week Four: Oakland Raiders at Denver Broncos – Game summary

Quarter	1	2	3	4	Total
Raiders	3	3	0	0	**6**
**Broncos**	10	0	21	6	**37**

at Sports Authority Field at Mile High, Denver, Colorado

- Date: September 30
- Game time: 2:05 p.m. MDT/1:05 p.m. PDT
- Game weather: 72 °F (22 °C), mostly sunny
- Game attendance: 76,787
- Referee: Pete Morelli
- TV announcers (CBS): Jim Nantz and Phil Simms

Game information

**First quarter**

- DEN – Joel Dreessen 22-yard pass from Peyton Manning (Matt Prater kick), 10:32. Broncos 7–0. **Drive: 11 plays, 80 yards, 4:28.**
- OAK – Sebastian Janikowski 38-yard field goal, 6:47. Broncos 7–3. **Drive: 9 plays, 60 yards, 3:45.**
- DEN – Matt Prater 21-yard field goal, 0:00. Broncos 10–3. **Drive: 13 plays, 77 yards, 6:47.**

**Second quarter**

- OAK – Sebastian Janikowski 24-yard field goal, 0:22. Broncos 10–6. **Drive: 9 plays, 58 yards, 2:52.**

**Third quarter**

- DEN – Eric Decker 17-yard pass from Peyton Manning (Matt Prater kick), 10:08. Broncos 17–6. **Drive: 9 plays, 79 yards, 3:51.**
- DEN – Willis McGahee 2-yard run (Matt Prater kick), 7:30. Broncos 24–6. **Drive: 4 plays, 18 yards, 1:47.**
- DEN – Lance Ball 14-yard pass from Peyton Manning (Matt Prater kick), 3:46. Broncos 31–6. **Drive: 5 plays, 63 yards, 1:36.**

**Fourth quarter**

- DEN – Matt Prater 43-yard field goal, 12:56. Broncos 34–6. **Drive: 11 plays, 44 yards, 4:49.**
- DEN – Matt Prater 53-yard field goal, 3:43. Broncos 37–6. **Drive: 12 plays, 41 yards, 7:17.**

**Top passers**

- OAK – Carson Palmer – 19/34, 202 yards
- DEN – Peyton Manning – 30/38, 338 yards, 3 TD

**Top rushers**

- OAK – Darren McFadden – 13 rushes, 34 yards
- DEN – Willis McGahee – 19 rushes, 112 yards, TD

**Top receivers**

- OAK – Denarius Moore – 4 receptions, 71 yards
- DEN – Demaryius Thomas – 5 receptions, 103 yards

With the loss, the Raiders went into their bye week at 1–3.

==== Week 6: at Atlanta Falcons ====
Week Six: Oakland Raiders at Atlanta Falcons – Game summary

Quarter	1	2	3	4	Total
Raiders	3	10	0	7	**20**
**Falcons**	0	7	6	10	**23**

at Georgia Dome, Atlanta, Georgia

- Date: October 14
- Game time: 1:00 p.m. EDT/10:00 a.m. PDT
- Game weather: Played indoors (dome stadium)
- Game attendance: 69,383
- Referee: Terry McAulay
- TV announcers (CBS): Greg Gumbel and Dan Dierdorf

Game information

**First quarter**

- OAK – Sebastian Janikowski 52-yard field goal, 0:24. Raiders 3–0. **Drive: 8 plays, 65 yards, 4:24.**

**Second quarter**

- ATL – Roddy White 4-yard pass from Matt Ryan (Matt Bryant kick), 9:51. Falcons 7–3. **Drive: 10 plays, 80 yards, 5:33.**
- OAK – Sebastian Janikowski 22-yard field goal, 4:11. Falcons 7–6. **Drive: 10 plays, 76 yards, 5:40.**
- OAK – Denarius Moore 25-yard pass from Carson Palmer (Sebastian Janikowski kick), 1:50. Raiders 13–7. **Drive: 2 plays, 28 yards, 0:54.**

**Third quarter**

- ATL – Matt Bryant 41-yard field goal, 5:06. Raiders 13–10. **Drive: 9 plays, 47 yards, 3:29.**
- ATL – Matt Bryant 20-yard field goal, 2:31. Tied 13–13. **Drive: 4 plays, 0 yards, 1:53.**

**Fourth quarter**

- ATL – Asante Samuel 79-yard interception return (Matt Bryant kick), 2:40. Falcons 20–13.
- OAK – Darren McFadden 2-yard run (Sebastian Janikowski kick), 0:40. Tied 20–20. **Drive: 8 plays, 80 yards, 2:00.**
- ATL – Matt Bryant 55-yard field goal, 0:01. Falcons 23–20. **Drive: 7 plays, 43 yards, 0:39.**

**Top passers**

- OAK – Carson Palmer – 23/33, 353 yards, TD, INT
- ATL – Matt Ryan – 24/37, 249 yards, TD, 3 INT

**Top rushers**

- OAK – Darren McFadden – 27 rushes, 70 yards, TD
- ATL – Michael Turner – 11 rushes, 33 yards

**Top receivers**

- OAK – Denarius Moore – 5 receptions, 104 yards, TD
- ATL – Roddy White – 6 receptions, 72 yards, TD

With the surprising loss, the Raiders fell to 1–4.

==== Week 7: vs. Jacksonville Jaguars ====
Week Seven: Jacksonville Jaguars at Oakland Raiders – Game summary

Quarter	1	2	3	4	OT	Total
Jaguars	7	10	3	3	0	**23**
**Raiders**	3	3	7	10	3	**26**

at O.co Coliseum, Oakland, California

- Date: October 21
- Game time: 1:25 p.m. PDT
- Game weather: 62 °F (17 °C), partly cloudy
- Game attendance: 51,634
- Referee: Scott Green
- TV announcers (CBS): Ian Eagle and Dan Fouts

Game information

**First quarter**

- OAK – Sebastian Janikowski 41-yard field goal, 6:13. Raiders 3–0. **Drive: 7 plays, 69 yards, 2:44.**
- JAX – Cecil Shorts 42-yard pass from Blaine Gabbert (Josh Scobee kick), 3:24. Jaguars 7–3. **Drive: 6 plays, 80 yards, 2:44.**

**Second quarter**

- JAX – Rashad Jennings 5-yard run (Josh Scobee kick), 11:34. Jaguars 14–3. **Drive: 3 plays, 16 yards, 0:46.**
- JAX – Josh Scobee 50-yard field goal, 5:57. Jaguars 17–3. **Drive: 4 plays, 4 yards, 0:55.**
- OAK – Sebastian Janikowski 33-yard field goal, 0:34. Jaguars 17–6. **Drive: 11 plays, 39 yards, 3:55.**

**Third quarter**

- JAX – Josh Scobee 40-yard field goal, 10:42. Jaguars 20–6. **Drive: 6 plays, 17 yards, 2:49.**
- OAK – Denarius Moore 8-yard pass from Carson Palmer (Sebastian Janikowski kick), 6:01. Jaguars 20–13. **Drive: 9 plays, 85 yards, 4:41.**

**Fourth quarter**

- JAX – Josh Scobee 45-yard field goal, 12:40. Jaguars 23–13. **Drive: 4 plays, -3 yards, 2:03.**
- OAK – Sebastian Janikowski 31-yard field goal, 6:52. Jaguars 23–16. **Drive: 12 plays, 79 yards, 5:48.**
- OAK – Carson Palmer 1-yard run (Sebastian Janikowski kick), 3:34. Tied 23–23. **Drive: 10 plays, 58 yards, 2:57.**

**Overtime**

- OAK – Sebastian Janikowski 40-yard field goal, 12:54. Raiders 26–23. **Drive: 2 plays, -1 yard, 0:37.**

**Top passers**

- JAX – Blaine Gabbert – 8/12, 110 yards, TD
- OAK – Carson Palmer – 26/46, 296 yards, TD, INT

**Top rushers**

- JAX – Rashad Jennings – 21 rushes, 44 yards, TD
- OAK – Darren McFadden – 19 rushes, 53 yards

**Top receivers**

- JAX – Cecil Shorts – 4 receptions, 79 yards, TD
- OAK – Darrius Heyward-Bey – 4 receptions, 85 yards

With the win, the Raiders improved to 2–4.

==== Week 8: at Kansas City Chiefs ====
Week Eight: Oakland Raiders at Kansas City Chiefs – Game summary

Quarter	1	2	3	4	Total
**Raiders**	3	10	10	3	**26**
Chiefs	0	6	3	7	**16**

at Arrowhead Stadium, Kansas City, Missouri

- Date: October 28
- Game time: 3:05 p.m. CDT/1:05 p.m. PDT
- Game weather: 50 °F (10 °C), sunny
- Game attendance: 74,730
- Referee: Bill Vinovich
- TV announcers (CBS): Kevin Harlan and Solomon Wilcots

Game information

**First quarter**

- OAK – Sebastian Janikowski 36-yard field goal, 9:51. Raiders 3–0. **Drive: 8 plays, 76 yards, 3:43.**

**Second quarter**

- OAK – Sebastian Janikowski 35-yard field goal, 14:44. Raiders 6–0. **Drive: 8 plays, 28 yards, 2:43.**
- KC – Ryan Succop 30-yard field goal, 10:21. Raiders 6–3. **Drive: 8 plays, 68 yards, 4:23.**
- KC – Ryan Succop 42-yard field goal, 4:12. Tied 6–6. **Drive: 8 plays, 30 yards, 4:34.**
- OAK – Denarius Moore 9-yard pass from Carson Palmer (Sebastian Janikowski kick), 0:49. Raiders 13–6. **Drive: 3 plays, 11 yards, 0:50.**

**Third quarter**

- OAK – Sebastian Janikowski 29-yard field goal, 13:58. Raiders 16–6. **Drive: 4 plays, 7 yards, 0:54.**
- KC – Ryan Succop 52-yard field goal, 8:40. Raiders 16–9. **Drive: 10 plays, 44 yards, 5:18.**
- OAK – Darrius Heyward-Bey 32-yard pass from Carson Palmer (Sebastian Janikowski kick), 5:40. Raiders 23–9. **Drive: 6 plays, 80 yards, 3:00.**

**Fourth quarter**

- OAK – Sebastian Janikowski 32-yard field goal, 8:14. Raiders 26–9. **Drive: 9 plays, 62 yards, 4:47.**
- KC – Dexter McCluster 10-yard pass from Matt Cassel (Ryan Succop kick), 2:27. Raiders 26–16. **Drive: 2 plays, 32 yards, 0:42.**

**Top passers**

- OAK – Carson Palmer – 14/28, 209 yards, 2 TD, INT
- KC – Matt Cassel – 20/30, 218 yards, TD, INT

**Top rushers**

- OAK – Darren McFadden – 29 rushes, 114 yards
- KC – Matt Cassel – 7 rushes, 35 yards

**Top receivers**

- OAK – Denarius Moore – 5 receptions, 96 yards, TD
- KC – Dwayne Bowe – 3 receptions, 65 yards

With the win, the Raiders improved to 3–4.

==== Week 9: vs. Tampa Bay Buccaneers ====
Week Nine: Tampa Bay Buccaneers at Oakland Raiders – Game summary

Quarter	1	2	3	4	Total
**Buccaneers**	0	7	21	14	**42**
Raiders	3	7	0	22	**32**

at O.co Coliseum, Oakland, California

- Date: November 4
- Game time: 1:05 p.m. PST
- Game weather: 71 °F (22 °C), sunny
- Game attendance: 52,055
- Referee: Walt Anderson
- TV announcers (Fox): Dick Stockton, John Lynch and Jennifer Hale

Game information

**First quarter**

- OAK – Sebastian Janikowski 29-yard field goal, 0:45. Raiders 3–0. **Drive: 10 plays, 33 yards, 4:08.**

**Second quarter**

- TB – Vincent Jackson 20-yard pass from Josh Freeman (Connor Barth kick), 12:54. Buccaneers 7–3. **Drive: 6 plays, 80 yards, 2:51.**
- OAK – Rod Streater 25-yard pass from Carson Palmer (Sebastian Janikowski kick), 1:20. Raiders 10–7. **Drive: 4 plays, 71 yards, 0:22.**

**Third quarter**

- TB – Doug Martin 45-yard run (Connor Barth kick), 12:09. Buccaneers 14–10. **Drive: 6 plays, 80 yards, 2:51.**
- TB – Mike Williams 4-yard pass from Josh Freeman (Connor Barth kick), 7:12. Buccaneers 21–10. **Drive: 7 plays, 60 yards, 3:26.**
- TB – Doug Martin 67-yard run (Connor Barth kick), 2:15. Buccaneers 28–10. **Drive: 2 plays, 68 yards, 0:52.**

**Fourth quarter**

- OAK – Brandon Myers 4-yard pass from Carson Palmer (Sebastian Janikowski kick), 14:11. Buccaneers 28–17. **Drive: 9 plays, 80 yards, 3:04.**
- TB – Doug Martin 70-yard run (Connor Barth kick), 13:51. Buccaneers 35–17. **Drive: 1 play, 70 yards, 0:20.**
- OAK – Brandon Myers 1-yard pass from Carson Palmer (Sebastian Janikowski kick), 9:48. Buccaneers 35–24. **Drive: 7 plays, 80 yards, 4:03.**
- OAK – Marcel Reece 13-yard pass from Carson Palmer (Carson Palmer-Juron Criner pass), 3:51. Buccaneers 35–32. **Drive: 11 plays, 65 yards, 3:52.**
- TB – Doug Martin 1-yard run (Connor Barth kick), 1:49. Buccaneers 42–32. **Drive: 3 plays, 22 yards, 0:38.**

**Top passers**

- TB – Josh Freeman – 18/30, 247 yards, 2 TD
- OAK – Carson Palmer – 39/61, 414 yards, 4 TD, 3 INT

**Top rushers**

- TB – Doug Martin – 25 rushes, 251 yards, 4 TD
- OAK – Darren McFadden – 7 rushes, 17 yards

**Top receivers**

- TB – Vincent Jackson – 2 receptions, 84 yards, TD
- OAK – Marcel Reece – 8 receptions, 95 yards, TD

With the loss, the Raiders fell to 3–5.

==== Week 10: at Baltimore Ravens ====
Week Ten: Oakland Raiders at Baltimore Ravens – Game summary

Quarter	1	2	3	4	Total
Raiders	0	10	7	3	**20**
**Ravens**	10	17	21	7	**55**

at M&T Bank Stadium, Baltimore, Maryland

- Date: November 11
- Game time: 1:00 p.m. EST/10:00 a.m. PST
- Game weather: 61 °F (16 °C), sunny
- Game attendance: 71,339
- Referee: Ron Winter
- TV announcers (CBS): Greg Gumbel and Dan Dierdorf

Game information

**First quarter**

- BAL – Justin Tucker 48-yard field goal, 8:49. Ravens 3–0. **Drive: 7 plays, 22 yards, 3:04.**
- BAL – Joe Flacco 1-yard run (Justin Tucker kick), 3:15. Ravens 10–0. **Drive: 8 plays, 63 yards, 3:56.**

**Second quarter**

- OAK – Sebastian Janikowski 21-yard field goal, 10:02. Ravens 10–3. **Drive: 6 plays, 16 yards, 2:25.**
- BAL – Dennis Pitta 5-yard pass from Joe Flacco (Justin Tucker kick), 7:49. Ravens 17–3. **Drive: 6 plays, 80 yards, 2:13.**
- BAL – Justin Tucker 34-yard field goal, 3:16. Ravens 20–3. **Drive: 6 plays, 16 yards, 2:52.**
- OAK – Darrius Heyward-Bey 55-yard pass from Carson Palmer (Sebastian Janikowski kick), 1:37. Ravens 20–10. **Drive: 7 plays, 80 yards, 1:39.**
- BAL – Ray Rice 7-yard run (Justin Tucker kick), 0:24. Ravens 27–10. **Drive: 7 plays, 80 yards, 1:13.**

**Third quarter**

- BAL – Torrey Smith 47-yard pass from Joe Flacco (Justin Tucker kick), 13:42. Ravens 34–10. **Drive: 3 plays, 70 yards, 1:18.**
- OAK – Denarius Moore 30-yard pass from Carson Palmer (Sebastian Janikowski kick), 10:31. Ravens 34–17. **Drive: 7 plays, 80 yards, 3:11.**
- BAL – Torrey Smith 20-yard pass from Joe Flacco (Justin Tucker kick), 9:20. Ravens 41–17. **Drive: 1 play, 20 yards, 0:07.**
- BAL – Sam Koch 7-yard run (Justin Tucker kick), 5:40. Ravens 48–17. **Drive: 9 plays, 74 yards, 3:04.**

**Fourth quarter**

- OAK – Sebastian Janikowski 47-yard field goal, 12:47. Ravens 48–20. **Drive: 10 plays, 61 yards, 4:41.**
- BAL – Jacoby Jones 105-yard kickoff return (Justin Tucker kick), 12:34. Ravens 55–20.

**Top passers**

- OAK – Carson Palmer – 29/45, 368 yards, 2 TD, INT
- BAL – Joe Flacco – 21/33, 341 yards, 3 TD, INT

**Top rushers**

- OAK – Marcel Reece – 13 rushes, 48 yards
- BAL – Ray Rice – 13 rushes, 35 yards, TD

**Top receivers**

- OAK – Denarius Moore – 4 receptions, 90 yards, TD
- BAL – Dennis Pitta – 5 receptions, 67 yards, TD

With the huge loss, the Raiders fell to 3–6.

==== Week 11: vs. New Orleans Saints ====
Week Eleven: New Orleans Saints at Oakland Raiders – Game summary

Quarter	1	2	3	4	Total
**Saints**	14	7	14	3	**38**
Raiders	0	7	3	7	**17**

at O.co Coliseum, Oakland, California

- Date: November 18
- Game time: 1:05 p.m. PST
- Game weather: 61 °F (16 °C), partly cloudy
- Game attendance: 56,880
- Referee: Pete Morelli
- TV announcers (Fox): Dick Stockton, John Lynch and Jennifer Hale

Game information

**First quarter**

- NO – Jimmy Graham 1-yard pass from Drew Brees (Garrett Hartley kick), 7:53. Saints 7–0. **Drive: 10 plays, 80 yards, 4:02.**
- NO – Malcolm Jenkins 55-yard interception return (Garrett Hartley kick), 4:06. Saints 14–0.

**Second quarter**

- OAK – Brandon Myers 1-yard pass from Carson Palmer (Sebastian Janikowski kick), 4:10. Saints 14–7. **Drive: 4 plays, 81 yards, 2:17.**
- NO – Lance Moore 38-yard pass from Drew Brees (Garrett Hartley kick), 0:48. Saints 21–7. **Drive: 8 plays, 90 yards, 3:22.**

**Third quarter**

- NO – Mark Ingram 27-yard run (Garrett Hartley kick), 14:43. Saints 28–7. **Drive: 1 play, 27 yards, 0:17.**
- OAK – Sebastian Janikowski 40-yard field goal, 10:22. Saints 28–10. **Drive: 10 plays, 54 yards, 4:21.**
- NO – Lance Moore 15-yard pass from Drew Brees (Garrett Hartley kick), 3:26. Saints 35–10. **Drive: 6 plays, 58 yards, 2:46.**

**Fourth quarter**

- NO – Garrett Hartley 47-yard field goal, 10:28. Saints 38–10. **Drive: 9 plays, 31 yards, 4:26.**
- OAK – Juron Criner 3-yard pass from Carson Palmer (Sebastian Janikowski kick), 4:00. Saints 38–17. **Drive: 7 plays, 93 yards, 2:03.**

**Top passers**

- NO – Drew Brees – 20/27, 219 yards, 3 TD
- OAK – Carson Palmer – 22/40, 312 yards, 2 TD, 2 INT

**Top rushers**

- NO – Mark Ingram – 12 rushes, 67 yards, TD
- OAK – Marcel Reece – 19 rushes, 103 yards

**Top receivers**

- NO – Marques Colston – 4 receptions, 69 yards
- OAK – Marcel Reece – 4 receptions, 90 yards

With the loss, the Raiders fell to 3–7.

==== Week 12: at Cincinnati Bengals ====
Week Twelve: Oakland Raiders at Cincinnati Bengals – Game summary

Quarter	1	2	3	4	Total
Raiders	0	0	10	0	**10**
**Bengals**	14	10	0	10	**34**

at Paul Brown Stadium, Cincinnati, Ohio

- Date: November 25
- Game time: 1:00 p.m. EST/10:00 a.m. PST
- Game weather: 41 °F (5 °C), mostly sunny
- Game attendance: 56,503
- Referee: Alberto Riveron
- TV announcers (CBS): Bill Macatee and Steve Tasker

Game information

**First quarter**

- CIN – BenJarvus Green-Ellis 1-yard run (Mike Nugent kick), 9:12. Bengals 7–0. **Drive: 5 plays, 58 yards, 2:19.**
- CIN – Mohamed Sanu 2-yard pass from Andy Dalton (Mike Nugent kick), 2:59. Bengals 14–0. **Drive: 9 plays, 88 yards, 4:28.**

**Second quarter**

- CIN – Mohamed Sanu 5-yard pass from Andy Dalton (Mike Nugent kick), 7:28. Bengals 21–0. **Drive: 13 plays, 89 yards, 5:58.**
- CIN – Mike Nugent 55-yard field goal, 0:00. Bengals 24–0. **Drive: 2 plays, 11 yards, 0:08.**

**Third quarter**

- OAK – Sebastian Janikowski 55-yard field goal, 10:28. Bengals 24–3. **Drive: 6 plays, 13 yards, 3:32.**
- OAK – Denarius Moore 20-yard pass from Carson Palmer (Sebastian Janikowski kick), 2:21. Bengals 24–10. **Drive: 5 plays, 52 yards, 3:08.**

**Fourth quarter**

- CIN – Mike Nugent 20-yard field goal, 12:29. Bengals 27–10. **Drive: 6 plays, 44 yards, 2:23.**
- CIN – Jermaine Gresham 7-yard pass from Andy Dalton (Mike Nugent kick), 3:39. Bengals 34–10. **Drive: 12 plays, 84 yards, 5:11.**

**Top passers**

- OAK – Carson Palmer – 19/34, 146 yards, TD, INT
- CIN – Andy Dalton – 16/30, 210 yards, 3 TD

**Top rushers**

- OAK – Marcel Reece – 15 rushes, 74 yards
- CIN – BenJarvus Green-Ellis – 19 rushes, 129 yards, TD

**Top receivers**

- OAK – Jeremy Stewart – 6 receptions, 37 yards
- CIN – A. J. Green – 3 receptions, 111 yards

The Raiders' loss drops their record to 3–8 and secures them their tenth consecutive non-winning campaign. This was Carson Palmer's first game against his former team, the Bengals, who he played for 8 years from 2003 to 2010.

==== Week 13: vs. Cleveland Browns ====
Week Thirteen: Cleveland Browns at Oakland Raiders – Game summary

Quarter	1	2	3	4	Total
**Browns**	0	10	3	7	**20**
Raiders	0	3	7	7	**17**

at O.co Coliseum, Oakland, California

- Date: December 2
- Game time: 1:25 p.m. PST
- Game weather: 61 °F (16 °C), cloudy skies
- Game attendance: 43,641
- Referee: Bill Leavy
- TV announcers (CBS): Bill Macatee and Steve Tasker (blacked out locally)

Game information

**First quarter**

- No scoring plays.

**Second quarter**

- CLE – Phil Dawson 41-yard field goal, 12:59. Browns 3–0. **Drive: 13 plays, 57 yards, 6:27.**
- CLE – Josh Gordon 44-yard pass from Brandon Weeden (Phil Dawson kick), 10:25. Browns 10–0. **Drive: 2 plays, 62 yards, 0:49.**
- OAK – Sebastian Janikowski 51-yard field goal, 4:28. Browns 10–3. **Drive: 8 plays, 37 yards, 2:44.**

**Third quarter**

- CLE – Phil Dawson 35-yard field goal, 9:51. Browns 13–3. **Drive: 10 plays, 48 yards, 5:09.**
- OAK – Rod Streater 64-yard pass from Carson Palmer (Sebastian Janikowski kick), 0:17. Browns 13–10. **Drive: 4 plays, 80 yards, 1:41.**

**Fourth quarter**

- CLE – Trent Richardson 3-yard run (Phil Dawson kick), 3:27. Browns 20–10. **Drive: 14 plays, 94 yards, 6:06.**
- OAK – Brandon Myers 17-yard pass from Carson Palmer (Sebastian Janikowski kick), 0:01. Browns 20–17. **Drive: 15 plays, 84 yards, 3:26.**

**Top passers**

- CLE – Brandon Weeden – 25/36, 364 yards, TD, 2 INT
- OAK – Carson Palmer – 34/54, 351 yards, 2 TD, INT

**Top rushers**

- CLE – Trent Richardson – 20 rushes, 72 yards, TD
- OAK – Jeremy Stewart – 9 rushes, 46 yards

**Top receivers**

- CLE – Josh Gordon – 6 receptions, 116 yards, TD
- OAK – Brandon Myers – 14 receptions, 130 yards, TD

With the loss, the Raiders dropped to 3–9 and have therefore been eliminated from playoff contention. This would become the first road victory for the Cleveland Browns since Week 2 of the 2011 season, and the first television blackout for the Raiders since Week 16 of the 2010 season.

==== Week 14: vs. Denver Broncos ====
Week Fourteen: Denver Broncos at Oakland Raiders – Game summary

Quarter	1	2	3	4	Total
**Broncos**	10	3	13	0	**26**
Raiders	0	7	0	6	**13**

at O.co Coliseum, Oakland, California

- Date: December 6
- Game time: 5:20 p.m. PST
- Game weather: 57 °F (14 °C), cloudy skies
- Game attendance: 53,807
- Referee: Clete Blakeman
- TV announcers (NFLN): Brad Nessler, Mike Mayock and Alex Flanagan

Game information

**First quarter**

- DEN – Joel Dreessen 6-yard pass from Peyton Manning (Matt Prater kick), 10:30. Broncos 7–0. **Drive: 10 plays, 68 yards, 4:30.**
- DEN – Matt Prater 43-yard field goal, 5:09. Broncos 10–0. **Drive: 10 plays, 50 yards, 4:42.**

**Second quarter**

- DEN – Matt Prater 34-yard field goal, 13:39. Broncos 13–0. **Drive: 10 plays, 64 yards, 4:14.**
- OAK – Darren McFadden 6-yard pass from Carson Palmer (Sebastian Janikowski kick), 1:59. Broncos 13–7. **Drive: 14 plays, 80 yards, 6:33.**

**Third quarter**

- DEN – Matt Prater 20-yard field goal, 7:30. Broncos 16–7. **Drive: 10 plays, 89 yards, 5:03.**
- DEN – Knowshon Moreno 1-yard run (Matt Prater kick), 5:07. Broncos 23–7. **Drive: 2 plays, 2 yards, 0:38.**
- DEN – Matt Prater 33-yard field goal, 0:19. Broncos 26–7. **Drive: 8 plays, 49 yards, 3:18.**

**Fourth quarter**

- OAK – Darrius Heyward-Bey 56-yard pass from Carson Palmer (pass failed), 5:36. Broncos 26–13. **Drive: 4 plays, 86 yards, 1:50.**

**Top passers**

- DEN – Peyton Manning – 26/36, 310 yards, TD
- OAK – Carson Palmer – 19/30, 273 yards, 2 TD, INT

**Top rushers**

- DEN – Knowshon Moreno – 32 rushes, 119 yards, TD
- OAK – Darren McFadden – 11 rushes, 52 yards

**Top receivers**

- DEN – Eric Decker – 8 receptions, 88 yards
- OAK – Rod Streater – 4 receptions, 100 yards

With the loss, the Raiders dropped to 3–10.

==== Week 15: vs. Kansas City Chiefs ====
Week Fifteen: Kansas City Chiefs at Oakland Raiders – Game summary

Quarter	1	2	3	4	Total
Chiefs	0	0	0	0	**0**
**Raiders**	3	6	3	3	**15**

at O.co Coliseum, Oakland, California

- Date: December 16
- Game time: 1:25 p.m. PST
- Game weather: 54 °F (12 °C), cloudy
- Game attendance: 51,446
- Referee: Tony Corrente
- TV announcers (CBS): Kevin Harlan and Solomon Wilcots

Game information

**First quarter**

- OAK – Sebastian Janikowski 20-yard field goal, 1:44. Raiders 3–0. **Drive: 11 plays, 58 yards, 5:52.**

**Second quarter**

- OAK – Sebastian Janikowski 50-yard field goal, 10:19. Raiders 6–0. **Drive: 4 plays, 7 yards, 1:46.**
- OAK – Sebastian Janikowski 57-yard field goal, 0:00. Raiders 9–0. **Drive: 7 plays, 56 yards, 0:56.**

**Third quarter**

- OAK – Sebastian Janikowski 30-yard field goal, 6:41. Raiders 12–0. **Drive: 13 plays, 81 yards, 7:25.**

**Fourth quarter**

- OAK – Sebastian Janikowski 41-yard field goal, 13:27. Raiders 15–0. **Drive: 9 plays, 69 yards, 4:04.**

**Top passers**

- KC – Brady Quinn – 18/32, 136 yards, INT
- OAK – Carson Palmer – 18/29, 182 yards

**Top rushers**

- KC – Jamaal Charles – 9 rushes, 10 yards
- OAK – Darren McFadden – 30 rushes, 110 yards

**Top receivers**

- KC – Dexter McCluster – 7 receptions, 59 yards
- OAK – Rod Streater – 5 receptions, 62 yards

The Raiders pitched a shutout for the first time since Week 17 of the 2002 Season against the Chiefs. With the win, the Raiders improved to 4–10 and avoided last place in the AFC West by virtue of a head-to-head sweep over the Chiefs (2–12).

==== Week 16: at Carolina Panthers ====
Week Sixteen: Oakland Raiders at Carolina Panthers – Game summary

Quarter	1	2	3	4	Total
Raiders	0	3	0	3	**6**
**Panthers**	7	7	0	3	**17**

at Bank of America Stadium, Charlotte, North Carolina

- Date: December 23
- Game time: 1:00 p.m. EST/10:00 a.m. PST
- Game weather: 53 °F (12 °C), cloudy
- Game attendance: 73,026
- Referee: Jerome Boger
- TV announcers (CBS): Spero Dedes and Steve Beuerlein

Game information

**First quarter**

- CAR – Steve Smith Sr. 23-yard pass from Cam Newton (Graham Gano kick), 3:12. Panthers 7–0. **Drive: 8 plays, 88 yards, 5:02.**

**Second quarter**

- OAK – Sebastian Janikowski 21-yard field goal, 6:25. Panthers 7–3. **Drive: 11 plays, 73 yards, 6:07.**
- CAR – Cam Newton 3-yard run (Graham Gano kick), 0:17. Panthers 14–3. **Drive: 4 plays, 29 yards, 1:04.**

**Third quarter**

- No scoring plays.

**Fourth quarter**

- OAK – Sebastian Janikowski 31-yard field goal, 13:18. Panthers 14–6. **Drive: 7 plays, 5 yards, 1:42.**
- CAR – Graham Gano 51-yard field goal, 2:46. Panthers 17–6. **Drive: 7 plays, 43 yards, 2:22.**

**Top passers**

- OAK – Matt Leinart – 16/32, 115 yards, INT
- CAR – Cam Newton – 18/29, 179 yards, TD, INT

**Top rushers**

- OAK – Darren McFadden – 17 rushes, 33 yards
- CAR – Cam Newton – 12 rushes, 60 yards, TD

**Top receivers**

- OAK – Darrius Heyward-Bey – 2 receptions, 38 yards
- CAR – Greg Olsen – 6 receptions, 53 yards

With the loss, the Raiders dropped their record to 4–11. The Raiders were swept by the NFC South.

==== Week 17: at San Diego Chargers ====
Week Seventeen: Oakland Raiders at San Diego Chargers – Game summary

Quarter	1	2	3	4	Total
Raiders	0	7	0	14	**21**
**Chargers**	10	7	7	0	**24**

at Qualcomm Stadium, San Diego, California

- Date: December 30
- Game time: 1:25 p.m. PST
- Game weather: 50 °F (10 °C), cloudy
- Game attendance: 66,486
- Referee: John Parry
- TV announcers (CBS): Bill Macatee and Steve Tasker

Game information

**First quarter**

- SD – Micheal Spurlock 99-yard kickoff return (Nick Novak kick), 14:48. Chargers 7–0.
- SD – Nick Novak 30-yard field goal, 4:11. Chargers 10–0. **Drive: 9 plays, 59 yards, 5:20.**

**Second quarter**

- OAK – Darrius Heyward-Bey 9-yard pass from Terrelle Pryor (Sebastian Janikowski kick), 12:11. Chargers 10–7. **Drive: 12 plays, 80 yards, 7:00.**
- SD – Antonio Gates 11-yard pass from Philip Rivers (Nick Novak kick), 2:48. Chargers 17–7. **Drive: 14 plays, 81 yards, 9:23.**

**Third quarter**

- SD – Danario Alexander 34-yard pass from Philip Rivers (Nick Novak kick), 4:59. Chargers 24–7. **Drive: 4 plays, 47 yards, 2:11.**

**Fourth quarter**

- OAK – Terrelle Pryor 3-yard run (Sebastian Janikowski kick), 7:43. Chargers 24–14. **Drive: 8 plays, 76 yards, 5:19.**
- OAK – Denarius Moore 5-yard pass from Terrelle Pryor (Sebastian Janikowski kick), 1:52. Chargers 24–21. **Drive: 3 plays, 11 yards, 0:53.**

**Top passers**

- OAK – Terrelle Pryor – 13/28, 150 yards, 2 TD, INT
- SD – Philip Rivers – 13/17, 151 yards, 2 TD

**Top rushers**

- OAK – Darren McFadden – 19 rushes, 57 yards
- SD – Jackie Battle – 19 rushes, 37 yards

**Top receivers**

- OAK – Rod Streater – 4 receptions, 77 yards
- SD – Eddie Royal – 4 receptions, 61 yards

With the loss, the Raiders finished the season with a 4–12 record. They were swept by the Chargers for the first time since 2009.

== Standings ==
AFC West
	W	L	T	PCT	DIV	CONF	PF	PA	STK
^{(1)} Denver Broncos	13	3	0	.813	6–0	10–2	481	289	W11
San Diego Chargers	7	9	0	.438	4–2	7–5	350	350	W2
Oakland Raiders	4	12	0	.250	2–4	4–8	290	443	L2
Kansas City Chiefs	2	14	0	.125	0–6	0–12	211	425	L4
