= Rutland High School (Macon, Georgia) =

Public secondary high school in Macon, Georgia, United States

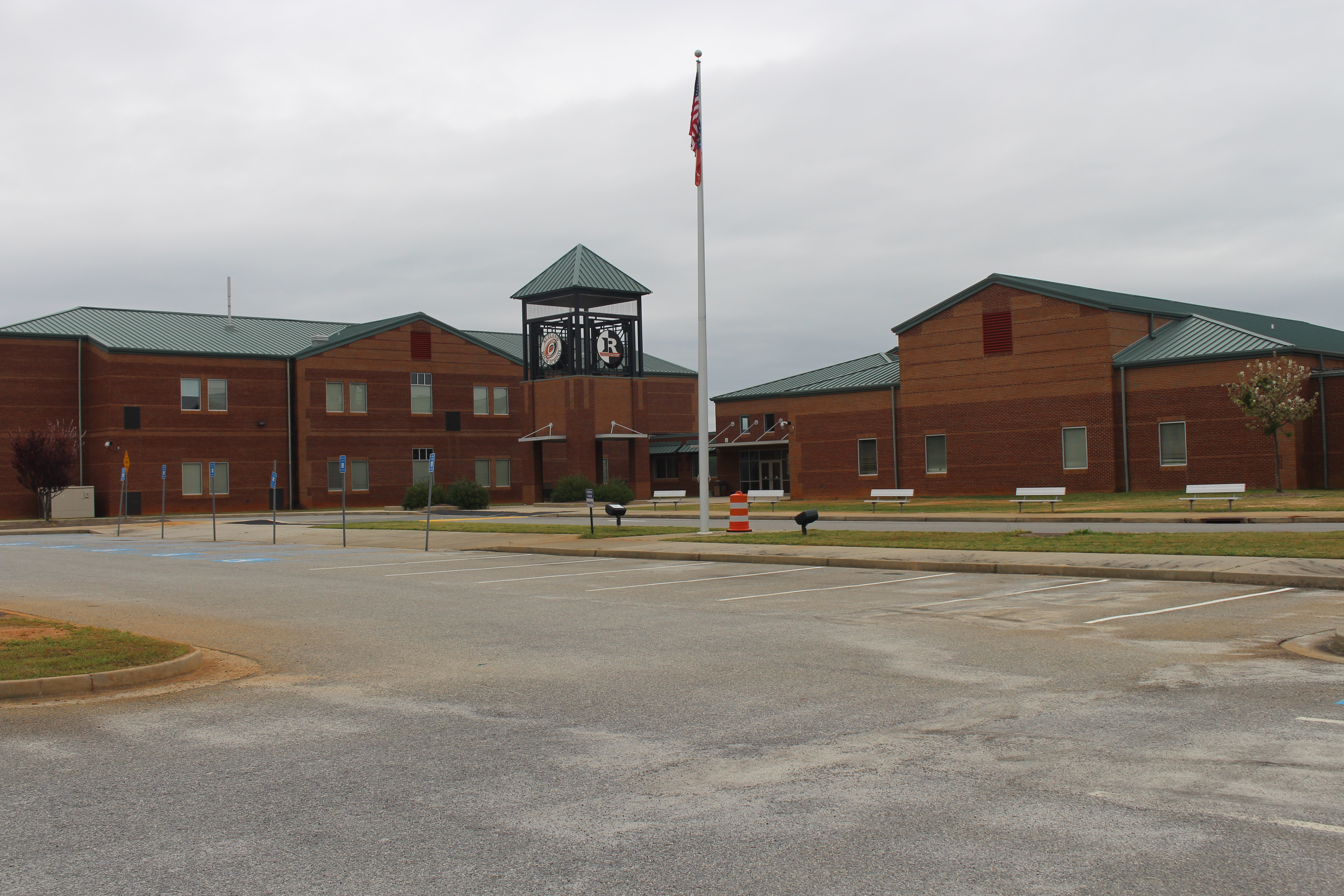
- Rutland High School

Location
- 6250 Skipper Rd; Macon, Georgia 31216; United States
- 32°44′16″N 83°42′51″W

Information
- School type: Public
- Motto: It's always a great day to be a Hurricane!
- Established: 2003 (23 years ago)
- School district: Bibb County School District
- CEEB code: 111956
- Principal: Dr. Wendy Pooler
- Teaching staff: 53.80 (FTE)
- Grades: 9-12
- Enrollment: 921 (2024-2025)
- Student to teacher ratio: 17.12
- Colors: Green, orange, white
- Athletics: Baseball, basketball, cheerleading, cross country, flag football, football, golf, soccer, softball, tennis, track, volleyball, wrestling
- Athletics conference: Georgia High School Association
- Mascot: Hurricanes
- Website: rutlandhs.bcsdk12.net

Rutland High School is a public high school located in Macon, Georgia, United States. It is part of the Bibb County School District.

== History ==
Rutland was built on 151-acre property in south Bibb County, purchased by the Bibb County Board of Education. It was built as a joint-campus with Rutland Middle School, with the two schools utilizing a shared kitchen and lunchroom. It opened in 2003 and serves grades 9 through 12.

In November of 2020, the school district completed a three year project to build a new 748-seat Performing Arts Center for Rutland High School.

In early 2023, Rutland opened a new agricultural barn, for students in both the high school and the middle school to learn how to care for cows and other agricultural studies in conjunction with Future Farmers of America.

== Athletics ==
Rutland High School athletic teams are known as the Rutland Hurricanes, and they compete in Georgia High School Association.

== Notable alumni ==
- Marquette King, former NFL punter (Oakland Raiders, Denver Broncos)
