= Marquette King =

American football player (born 1988)

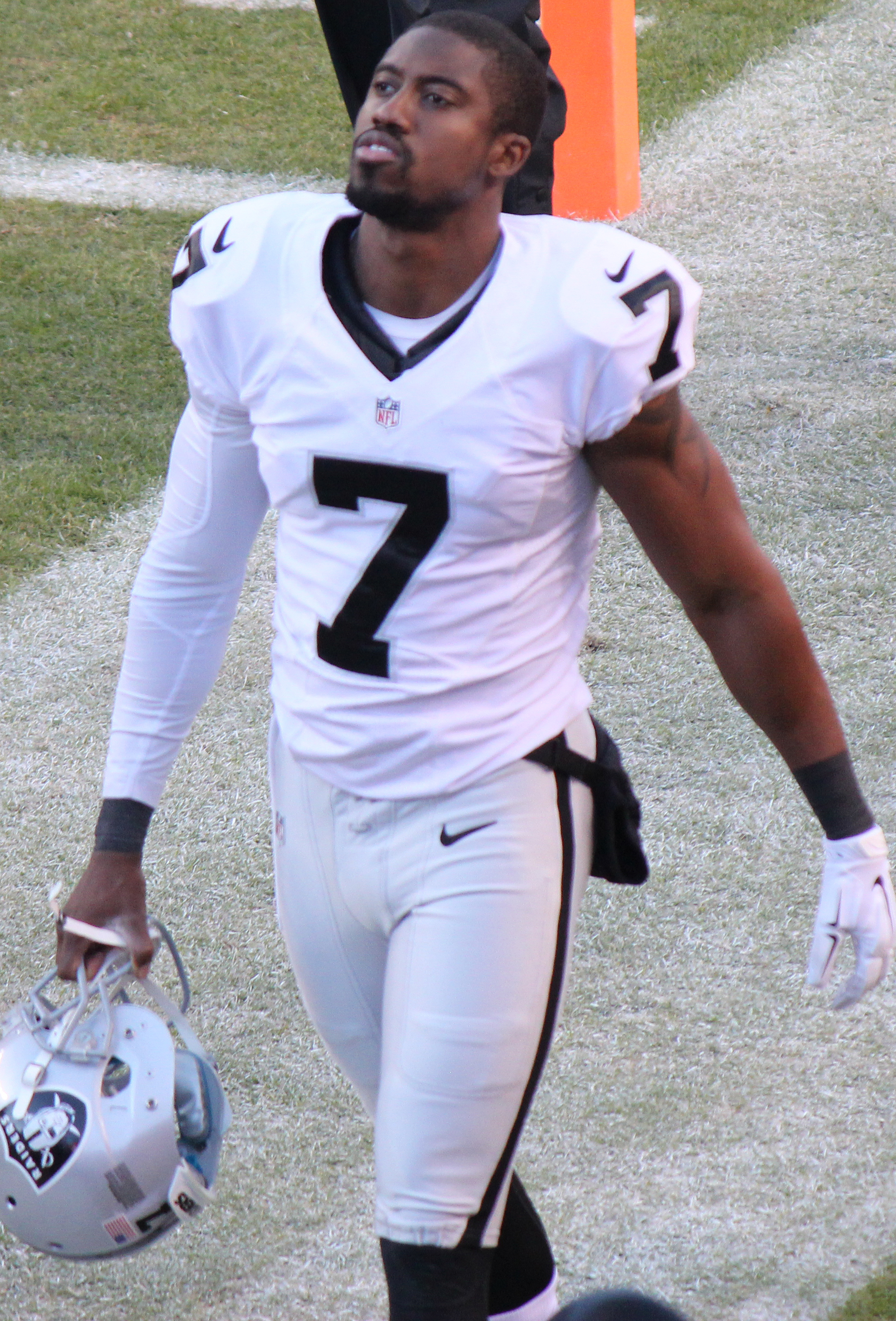
- King with the Oakland Raiders in 2015

No. 7, 1, 0
- Position: Punter

Personal information
- Born: October 26, 1988 (age 38); Macon, Georgia, U.S.
- Listed height: 6 ft 0 in (1.83 m)
- Listed weight: 192 lb (87 kg)

Career information
- High school: Rutland (Macon)
- College: Fort Valley State (2008–2011)
- NFL draft: 2012: undrafted

Career history
- Oakland Raiders (2012–2017); Denver Broncos (2018); St. Louis BattleHawks (2020); Arlington Renegades (2023–2025)

Awards and highlights
- Second-team All-Pro (2016); NFL punting yards leader (2014); All-UFL Team (2024); XFL champion (2023); XFL punting yards leader (2020); First-team All-SIAC (2011)

Career NFL statistics
- Punts: 446
- Punting yards: 20,822
- Average punt: 46.7
- Longest punt: 72
- Inside 20: 163
- Stats at Pro Football Reference

Marquette King Jr. (born October 26, 1988) is an American former professional football player who was a punter in the National Football League (NFL). He played college football for the Fort Valley State Wildcats and was signed by the Oakland Raiders of the National Football League (NFL) as an undrafted free agent in 2012. King led the NFL in punting yards in 2014.

== Early life ==
King was born and raised in Macon, Georgia, by his parents Audrey and Marquette King Sr. He has a younger sister named Jasmine. King began punting in high school and, as a child, he loved football and wanted to become a wide receiver. King practiced after his football practices at Rutland High School and asked teammates to join. After they declined his invitation, King decided to try punting during his free time, challenging himself to see how far he could kick. King's high school coach soon recognized his talent and named King the team's punter, in addition to his role as a wide receiver.

== College career ==
King attended Fort Valley State University where he was originally recruited as a wide receiver. However, King could not find playing time at the position. As a junior, when his new head coach learned that King practiced punting in his spare time, he threatened to revoke King's scholarship unless he focused on becoming a full-time punter. King recounted this, and said "When [the coach] threatened to take my scholarship away from me to focus on being a punter I was like, 'All right, well, if you want to take my scholarship away from me, well, I'm [going to] find a way to make this position look fun.'"

In his senior year, King was an All-First-team Southern Intercollegiate Athletic Conference member and the 2011 FVSU Wildcats Most Valuable Player. During the 2011 season, King punted 80 yards against Bethune-Cookman University. During the 2011 season, King led the SIAC Conference in punting with a 43 yards per punt average, with 21 punts landing inside his opponents' 20-yard-line and 16 of his punts yielded 50 yards or more. King competed in the first annual NFLPA Collegiate Bowl in 2012.

== Professional career ==
Pre-draft measurables
| Height | Weight | 40-yard dash |
|---|---|---|
| 6 ft 0 1/8 in (1.83 m) | 192 lb (87 kg) | 4.67 s |
All values from Pro Day

=== Oakland Raiders ===
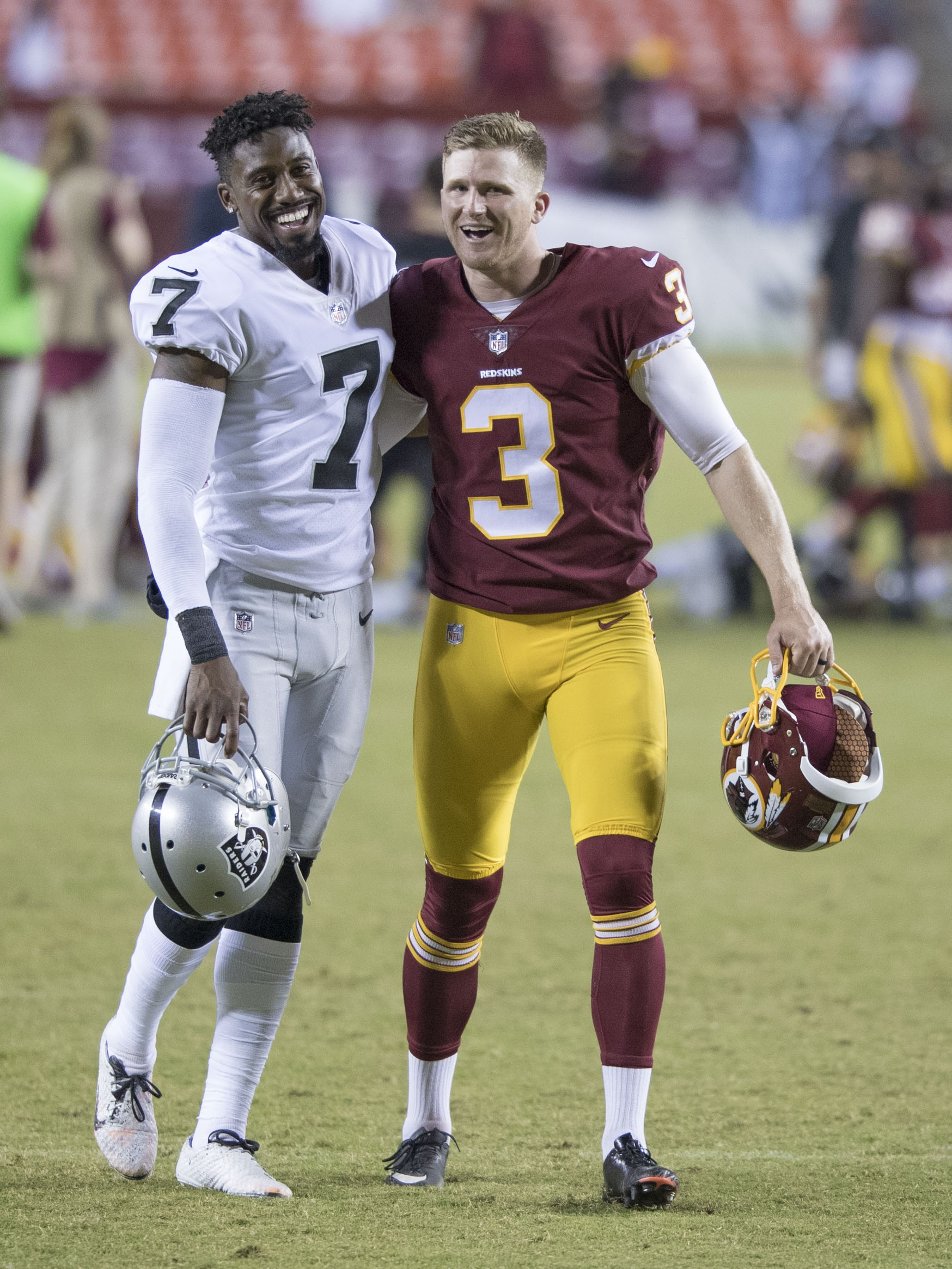
King alongside Dustin Hopkins in a 2017 game against the Washington Redskins

After going undrafted in the 2012 NFL draft, the Oakland Raiders had King try out for the team.

On April 29, 2012, the Raiders signed King to a three-year, $1.36 million contract. In training camp, King took most of the punting snaps due to an earlier injury to veteran Shane Lechler. King impressed the coaches enough to be kept on the roster but was placed on injured reserve for the entire 2012 NFL season.

With Lechler signing a free-agent contract with the Houston Texans, King competed for the Oakland Raiders punting job during the 2013 preseason with experienced veteran Chris Kluwe. King won the punting job, and Kluwe was cut at the conclusion of the preseason. During the 2013 season, King led the league in gross yards per punt, with 48.9.

In 2014, King led the league in punting yards and total punts, with 4,930 on 109 punts. These numbers also set single-season Oakland Raiders franchise records.

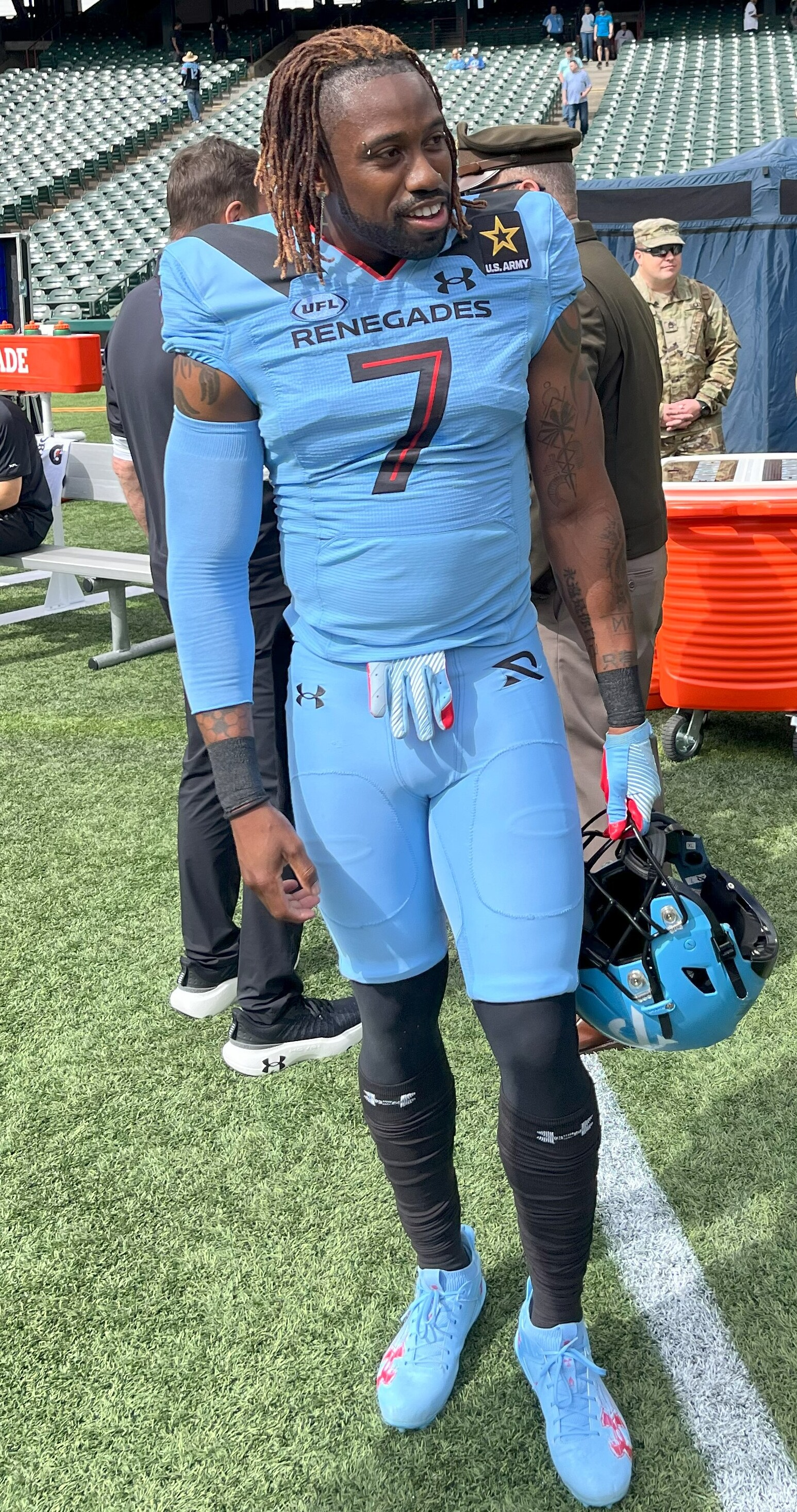
King in 2024

On March 11, 2015, King signed a one-year, $1.54 million contract to remain with the Raiders. He was named the AFC Special Teams Player of the Week in Week 15.

On February 29, 2016, the Raiders signed King to a five-year, $16.5 million extension with $12.5 million guaranteed and a signing bonus of $250,000. On September 23, King was fined $18,231 for a touchdown saving horse-collar tackle on Eric Weems during a Week 2 game against the Atlanta Falcons. During the 2016 season, King was named the AFC Special Teams Player of the Week in Week 7.

On March 30, 2018, the Raiders released King.

During King's career at the Raiders, his on the field celebrations and dances following punts were covered regularly by sports media. Often described as "eccentric", Cordarrelle Patterson explained that some on the Raiders team did not understand King's personality following his release, with the media discussing whether his profile had got in the way of his success.

=== Denver Broncos ===
On April 5, 2018, the Denver Broncos signed King to a three-year contract worth $7 million. He was placed on injured reserve on October 6 with a thigh injury. Two days later, the Broncos reached an injury settlement with King and he was released.

=== St. Louis Battlehawks ===
King was selected by the St. Louis Battlehawks in the 2020 XFL Supplemental Draft on November 22, 2019. He played in five games with them, and had 19 punts for 868 yards. King had his contract terminated when the league suspended operations on April 10, 2020.

=== Arlington Renegades ===
King was selected in the 2023 XFL draft by the Arlington Renegades. He re-signed with the team on January 29, 2024. King was named to the 2024 All-UFL team on June 5. He re-signed with the Renegades on October 25.

King announced his retirement from professional football on February 9, 2026, stating he was convinced that the NFL was never going to give him another opportunity to play: "if the league’s gatekeepers want to block me out, I’ll shut that door myself(.)"

== NFL career statistics ==
Legend
| | Led the league |
| **Bold** | Career high |

=== Regular season ===
| Year | Team | GP | Punting | | | | |
| Year | Team | GP | Punts | Yds | Avg | Blk | Lng |
|---|---|---|---|---|---|---|---|
| 2012 | OAK | 0 | Did not play due to injury | | | | |
| 2013 | OAK | **16** | 84 | 4,107 | **48.9** | **2** | 66 |
| 2014 | OAK | **16** | **109** | **4,930** | 45.2 | 0 | 62 |
| 2015 | OAK | **16** | 83 | 3,697 | 44.5 | 1 | 70 |
| 2016 | OAK | **16** | 81 | 3,937 | 48.6 | 0 | **72** |
| 2017 | OAK | **16** | 69 | 3,270 | 47.4 | 0 | 65 |
| 2018 | DEN | 4 | 20 | 881 | 44.1 | 0 | 66 |
| Career | | 84 | 446 | 20,822 | 46.7 | 3 | 163 |

=== Postseason ===
| Year | Team | GP | Punting | | | | |
| Year | Team | GP | Punts | Yds | Avg | Blk | Lng |
|---|---|---|---|---|---|---|---|
| 2016 | OAK | 1 | 10 | 457 | 45.7 | 0 | 62 |
| Career | | 1 | 10 | 457 | 45.7 | 0 | 62 |
