= Desmond Bryant =

American football player (born 1985)

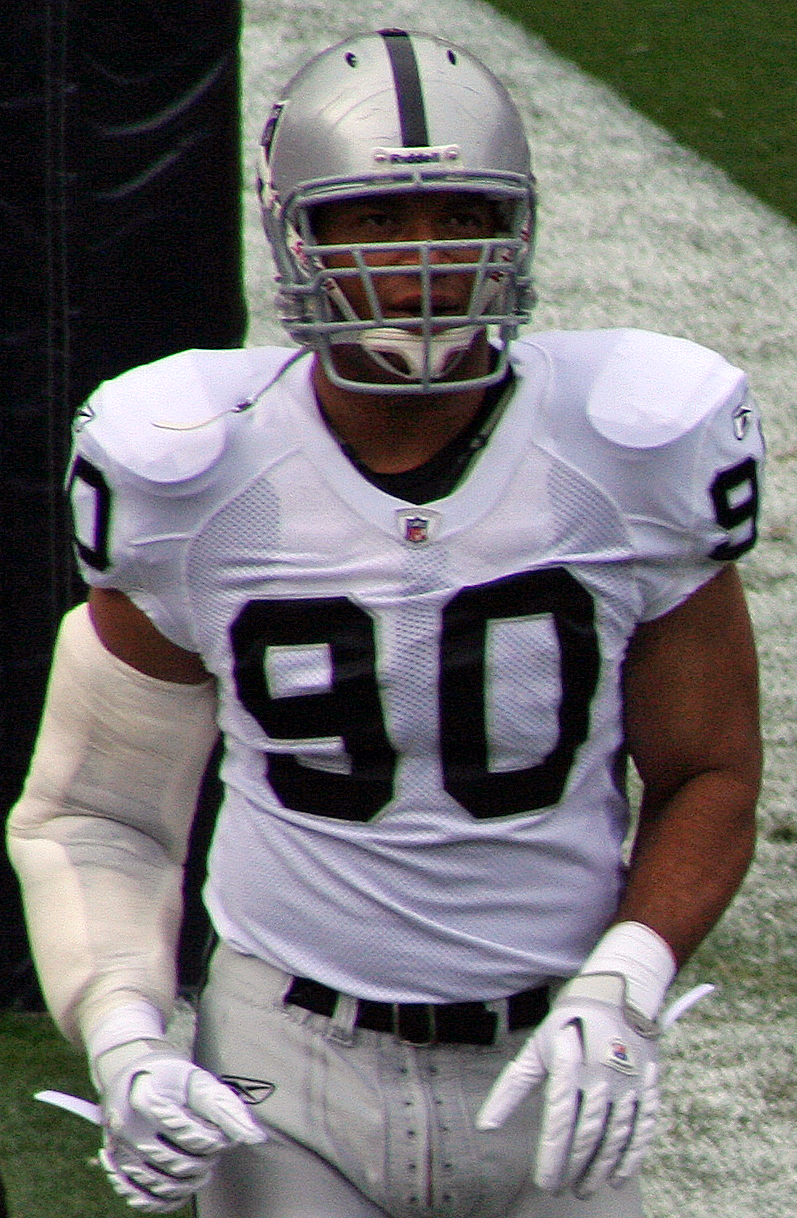
- Bryant with the Oakland Raiders in October 2010

No. 90, 92
- Position: Defensive tackle

Personal information
- Born: December 15, 1985 (age 40); Shorewood, Illinois, U.S.
- Listed height: 6 ft 6 in (1.98 m)
- Listed weight: 310 lb (141 kg)

Career information
- High school: East Bladen (Elizabethtown, North Carolina)
- College: Harvard
- NFL draft: 2009: undrafted

Career history
- Oakland Raiders (2009–2012); Cleveland Browns (2013–2016)

Career NFL statistics
- Total tackles: 238
- Sacks: 25.0
- Forced fumbles: 4
- Fumble recoveries: 2
- Pass deflections: 3
- Stats at Pro Football Reference

Desmond Jerel Bryant (born December 15, 1985) is an American former professional football player who was a defensive tackle in the National Football League (NFL). He played college football for the Harvard Crimson and was signed by the Oakland Raiders as an undrafted free agent in 2009.

== Early life and college ==
Bryant was born in Shorewood, Illinois to Alton and Lillian Bryant. He graduated from East Bladen High School at Elizabethtown, North Carolina in 2004. In his senior season, Bryant helped his high school football team to a 13-1 record. That was his only year playing high school football in North Carolina. His high school number is retired at East Bladen. Bryant played football and basketball for three years while attending high school in Middletown, Delaware and played for the East Bladen basketball team for two seasons. With a weighted 4.2 grade point average and 1230 SAT score, Bryant chose Harvard despite offers by Duke, Florida A&M, and Towson University. As Ivy League schools do not offer athletic or academic scholarships, Bryant received a financial aid scholarship. Harvard coach Tim Murphy thought that Bryant could be a four-year starter and potentially a professional player and compared Bryant to a Southeastern Conference player. At Harvard, Bryant majored in economics and played 32 games in four seasons. In his senior season, Bryant was named second-team All-Ivy League after leading Harvard with eight quarterback hurries and 4.5 tackles leading to losses.

Reflecting on his college years, Bryant told the Los Angeles Times: "The Ivy League's not really my type of environment. I had some really good teammates and friends, but outside of the football world I didn't interact much with the other kids."

== Professional career ==
Pre-draft measurables
Height	Weight	40-yard dash	10-yard split	20-yard split	20-yard shuttle	Three-cone drill	Vertical jump	Broad jump	Bench press
6 ft 5 5/8 in (1.97 m)	288 lb (131 kg)	4.92 s	1.67 s	2.82 s	4.45 s	7.44 s	31.0 in (0.79 m)	9 ft 10 in (3.00 m)	35 reps
All values from Pro Day

=== Oakland Raiders ===
Bryant is the 29th Harvard Crimson football player to play in the NFL. In April 2009, Bryant signed a free agent contract with the Oakland Raiders. Bryant played all 16 games of his rookie season and had 24 solo and 8 assisted tackles. The next season, Bryant made 2.5 sacks.

=== Cleveland Browns ===
Bryant signed with the Cleveland Browns on March 12, 2013 as an unrestricted free agent for a five-year $34 million contract, with $15 million guaranteed.

Bryant started 12 games with the Browns in 2013, recording 31 tackles and 3.5 sacks. On December 4, 2013, Bryant was placed on the reserve/non-football illness list, ending his season, after Bryant had issues with an irregular heartbeat.

Bryant returned to play in the 2014 season, starting all 15 games he played with five sacks, one fumble recovery, and 50 tackles.

During the 2016 offseason, Bryant was ruled out for the season due to tearing a pectoral muscle while weightlifting.

On August 22, 2017, Bryant was released by the Browns.

== NFL career statistics ==
Legend
**Bold**	Career high

Year	Team	Games		Tackles					Interceptions					Fumbles			
Year	Team	GP	GS	Cmb	Solo	Ast	Sck	TFL	Int	Yds	TD	Lng	PD	FF	FR	Yds	TD
2009	OAK	**16**	0	32	24	8	0.0	0	0	0	0	0	0	**1**	**1**	0	0
2010	OAK	15	0	21	15	6	2.5	4	0	0	0	0	0	0	0	0	0
2011	OAK	**16**	10	35	**30**	5	5.0	**8**	0	0	0	0	**1**	**1**	0	0	0
2012	OAK	**16**	8	36	26	10	3.0	**8**	0	0	0	0	**1**	**1**	0	0	0
2013	CLE	12	12	31	11	20	3.5	3	0	0	0	0	0	0	0	0	0
2014	CLE	15	**15**	**50**	25	**25**	5.0	**8**	0	0	0	0	**1**	0	**1**	0	0
2015	CLE	14	14	33	24	9	**6.0**	7	0	0	0	0	0	**1**	0	0	0
		104	59	238	155	83	25.0	38	0	0	0	0	3	4	2	0	0

== Personal life ==
In June 2010, Bryant was one of five men arrested for an attack in a parking lot. Bryant was arrested on a misdemeanor criminal mischief charge for allegedly showing up drunk and shirtless at a Florida family's home on February 24, 2013. His mug shot showing him intoxicated with his eyes half closed and tongue sticking out went viral.
