= Jeremy Stewart =

American gridiron football player (born 1989)

No. 27, 32
- Position: Running back

Personal information
- Born: February 17, 1989 (age 37); Baton Rouge, Louisiana, U.S.
- Listed height: 6 ft 1 in (1.85 m)
- Listed weight: 230 lb (104 kg)

Career information
- College: Stanford
- NFL draft: 2012: undrafted

Career history
- Philadelphia Eagles (2012)*; New York Jets (2012)*; Oakland Raiders (2012–2013); Denver Broncos (2014); Hamilton Tiger-Cats (2017)*
- * Offseason or practice squad member only

Career NFL statistics
- Rushing yards: 125
- Rushing average: 3.8
- Rushing touchdowns: 1
- Receptions: 10
- Receiving yards: 68
- Stats at Pro Football Reference
- Stats at CFL.ca

Jeremy Stewart (born February 17, 1989) is an American former professional football player who was a running back in the National Football League (NFL). He signed with the Philadelphia Eagles as an undrafted free agent. He played college football for the Stanford Cardinal.

He was also a member of the New York Jets and Oakland Raiders.

== Early life ==
He attended to Catholic High School in Baton Rouge, Louisiana. He was a first-team all-state, all-district and all-metro in his senior year.

== College career ==
He played college football at Stanford University. He finished college with 920 rushing yards, 14 rushing touchdowns, 18 receptions, 123 receiving yards, one receiving touchdown and 622 kick return yards.

In his freshman year, he had 343 rushing yards, 2 rushing touchdowns, 7 receptions, 14 receiving yards.

In his sophomore year, he had 76 rushing yards, one reception for 8 yards for the season.

In his junior year, he had 107 rushing yards, one rushing touchdown, 3 receptions and 22 receiving yards.

== Professional career ==
=== Philadelphia Eagles ===
On April 29, 2012, he signed with the Philadelphia Eagles as an undrafted free agent.

=== New York Jets ===
On August 8, 2012, he was claimed off waivers by the New York Jets. On August 27, 2012, he was released.

=== Oakland Raiders ===
On September 2, 2012, he was signed to the practice squad of the Oakland Raiders. On November 10, 2012, Stewart was signed from the practice squad to the active roster. On August 30, 2014, he was released.

=== Denver Broncos ===
On October 8, 2014, he was signed to the Broncos' practice squad. On November 22, 2014, he was promoted to the active roster.

=== Hamilton Tiger-Cats ===
On April 17, 2017, Stewart signed with the Hamilton Tiger-Cats.
