= Corey Gatewood =

American football wide receiver and cornerback

Profile
- Position: Receiver / cornerback

Personal information
- Listed height: 5 ft 11 in (1.80 m)
- Listed weight: 188 lb (85 kg)

Career information
- High school: Belmont (Belmont, Massachusetts)
- College: Stanford (2007–2012)
- NFL draft: 2012: undrafted

Career history
- Minnesota Vikings (2012)*
- * Offseason or practice squad member only

Corey Gatewood played both wide receiver and cornerback at Stanford University. He was signed by the Minnesota Vikings as an undrafted free agent cornerback in June 2012. On August 25, 2012, he was released by the Vikings. He was the number one receiver from the state of Massachusetts in his high school class.
