= List of Las Vegas Raiders first-round draft picks =

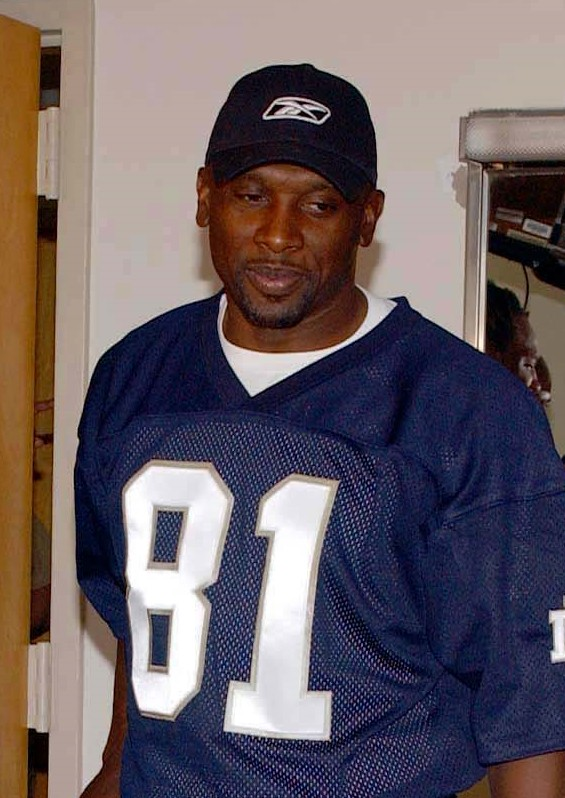
Tim Brown was a wide receiver and return specialist who was drafted sixth overall by the Raiders in the 1988 NFL draft. Brown spent 16 seasons with the Raiders, during which time he was an All-Pro, a nine-time Pro Bowler, and was selected to the 1990s All-Decade Team. He had nine seasons with over 1,000 receiving yards and, at the time of his retirement, was second in career receiving yards, third in career receptions, and third in career receiving touchdowns. He was inducted into the Pro Football Hall of Fame in 2015.

The Las Vegas Raiders are a professional American football team based in the Las Vegas metropolitan area. The Raiders compete in the National Football League (NFL) as a member of the league's American Football Conference West Division. Founded on January 30, 1960, as the Oakland Raiders, they were a charter member of the American Football League (AFL) and joined the NFL in 1970 following the AFL–NFL merger. The team departed Oakland to play in Los Angeles from the 1982 season through the 1994 season, becoming the Los Angeles Raiders, before returning to Oakland and switching back to being the Oakland Raiders at the start of the 1995 season. Prior to the start of the 2020 season, the Raiders moved to Las Vegas and changed their name to the Las Vegas Raiders. The team began utilizing Allegiant Stadium in Paradise, Nevada, for home games the same year.

The NFL draft, officially known as the "NFL Annual Player Selection Meeting", is an annual event which serves as the league's most common source of player recruitment. The draft order is determined based on the previous season's standings; the teams with the worst win–loss records receive the earliest picks. Teams that qualified for the NFL playoffs select after non-qualifiers, and their order depends on how far they advanced, using their regular season record as a tie-breaker. The final two selections in the first round are reserved for the Super Bowl runner-up and champion. Draft picks are tradable and players or other picks can be acquired with them.

Before the merger agreements in 1966, the AFL directly competed with the NFL and held a separate draft. This led to a bidding war over top prospects between the two leagues, along with the subsequent drafting of the same player in each draft. As part of the merger agreement on June 8, 1966, the two leagues began holding a multiple round "common draft". Once the AFL officially merged with the NFL in 1970, the "common draft" simply became the NFL draft. The first AFL draft was held prior to the start of the 1960 season. The first round of the 1960 AFL draft was territorial selections. Each team received a "territorial pick" which allowed them to select a single player within a pre-agreed upon designated region (the team's "territory"). Teams then agreed on the top eight players at each position, who were subsequently assigned to teams by random draw, with each of the eight teams receiving one of those players. This process was repeated until all 53 roster spots were filled. Beginning in the 1961 draft, the AFL, using the same system as the NFL, began to assign picks based on the previous season's standings.

Since the team's first draft, the Raiders have selected 66 players in the first round. The team's first-round pick in the inaugural AFL draft was Dale Hackbart, a defensive back from Wisconsin; he was the team's territorial selection. The Raiders have drafted first overall twice, selecting JaMarcus Russell in the 2007 NFL draft. In the most recent draft, held in 2026, the Raiders selected Indiana quarterback Fernando Mendoza.

The Raiders did not draft a player in the first round on eleven occasions. Five of the team's first-round picks—Marcus Allen, Tim Brown, Ray Guy, Gene Upshaw, and Charles Woodson—have been elected to the Pro Football Hall of Fame. The Raiders used four first-round picks in the 1960s to select players—Roman Gabriel, Dale Hackbart, Tony Lorick, and Joe Rutgens—who chose to sign with the NFL instead.

== Player selections ==
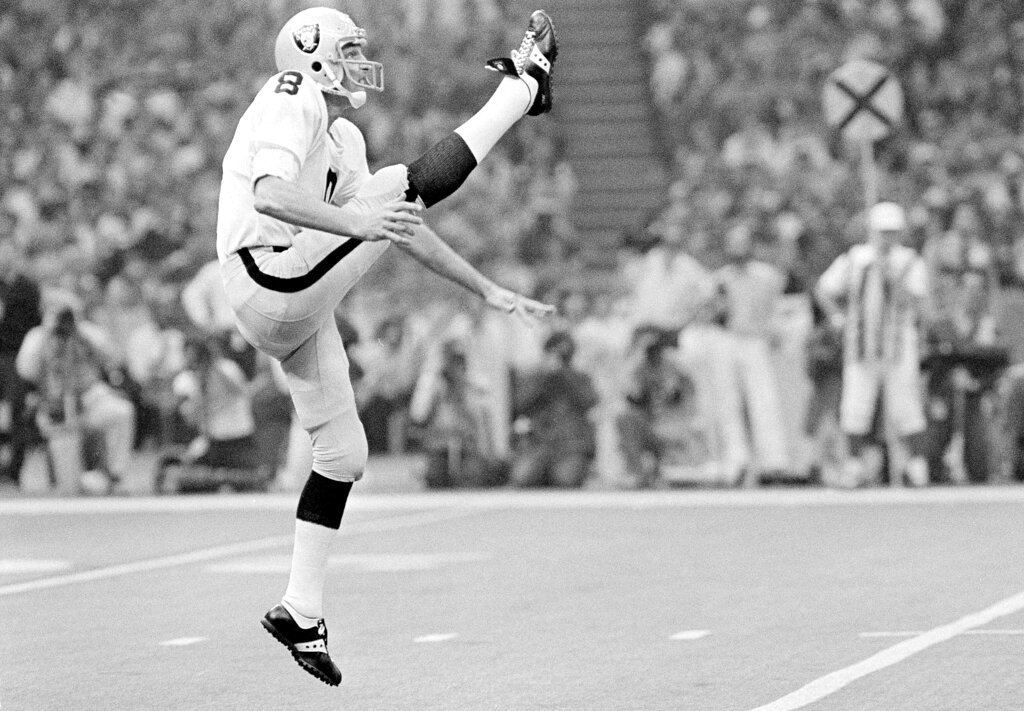
The Raiders selected Ray Guy with the 23rd overall pick of the 1973 NFL draft, making him the first ever punter drafted in the first round. Guy spent his entire career with the Raiders, during which time he was an eight-time All-Pro, seven-time Pro Bowler, and made the 1970s All-Decade Team. In 2014, Guy became the first punter elected to the Pro Football Hall of Fame. He was also selected for the NFL 100th Anniversary All-Time Team.

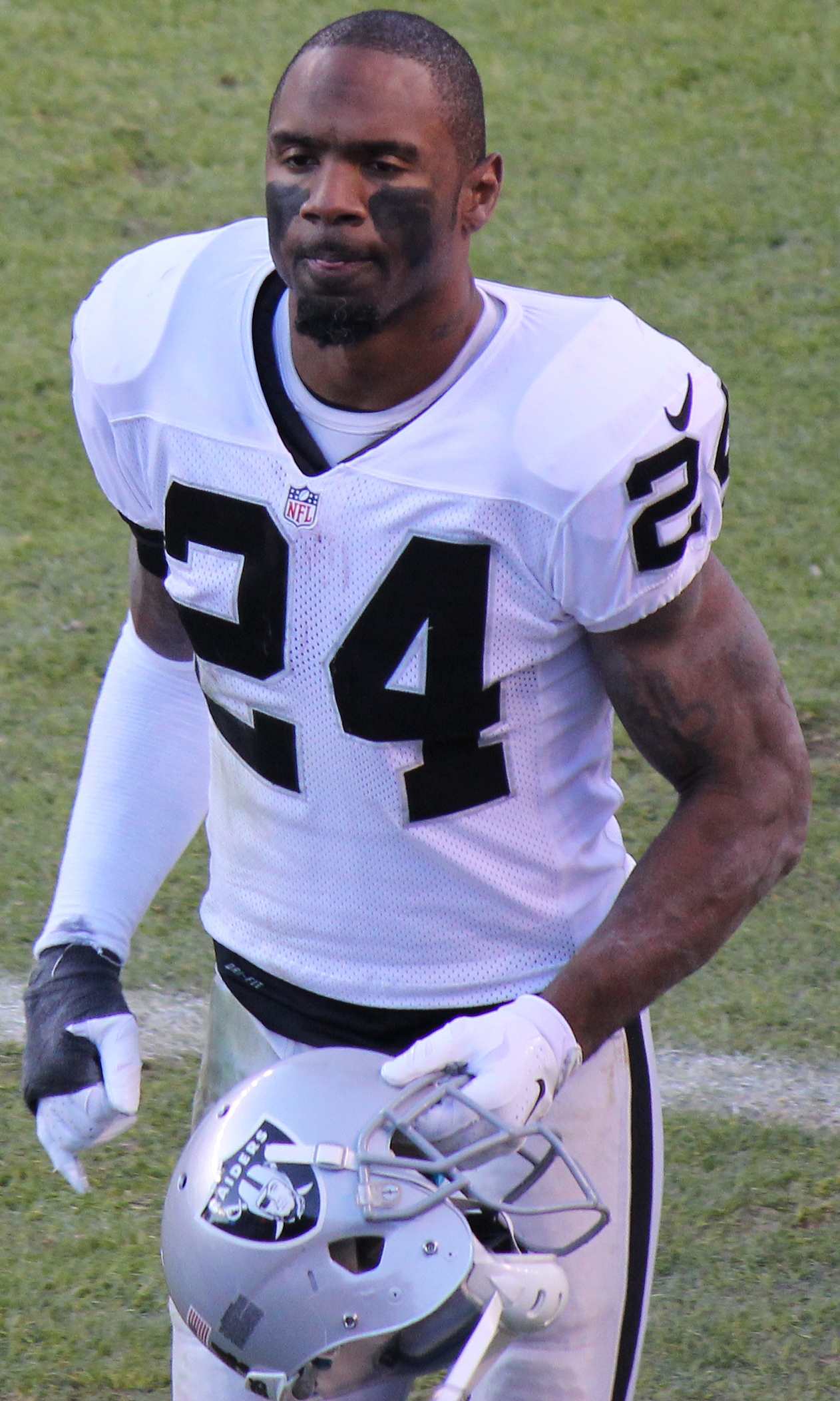
Charles Woodson was drafted fourth overall in the 1998 NFL draft. He played 11 seasons for the Raiders, during which time he was a four-time All-Pro, five-time Pro Bowler, and was the Defensive Rookie of the Year. He was selected to the 2000s All-Decade Team and was a first-ballot Pro Football Hall of Famer in 2021.

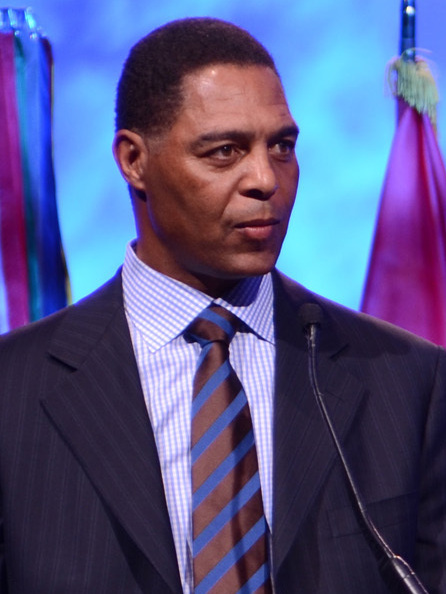
Marcus Allen was a running back drafted by the Raiders in the 1982 NFL draft. During his time with the team, he was the 1982 Offensive Rookie of the Year, 1985 Offensive Player of the Year, 1985 MVP, Super Bowl XVIII MVP, a three-time All-Pro, and a six-time Pro Bowler. Allen finished his career as the career rushing touchdowns leader and was a first-ballot Pro Football Hall of Famer in 2003.

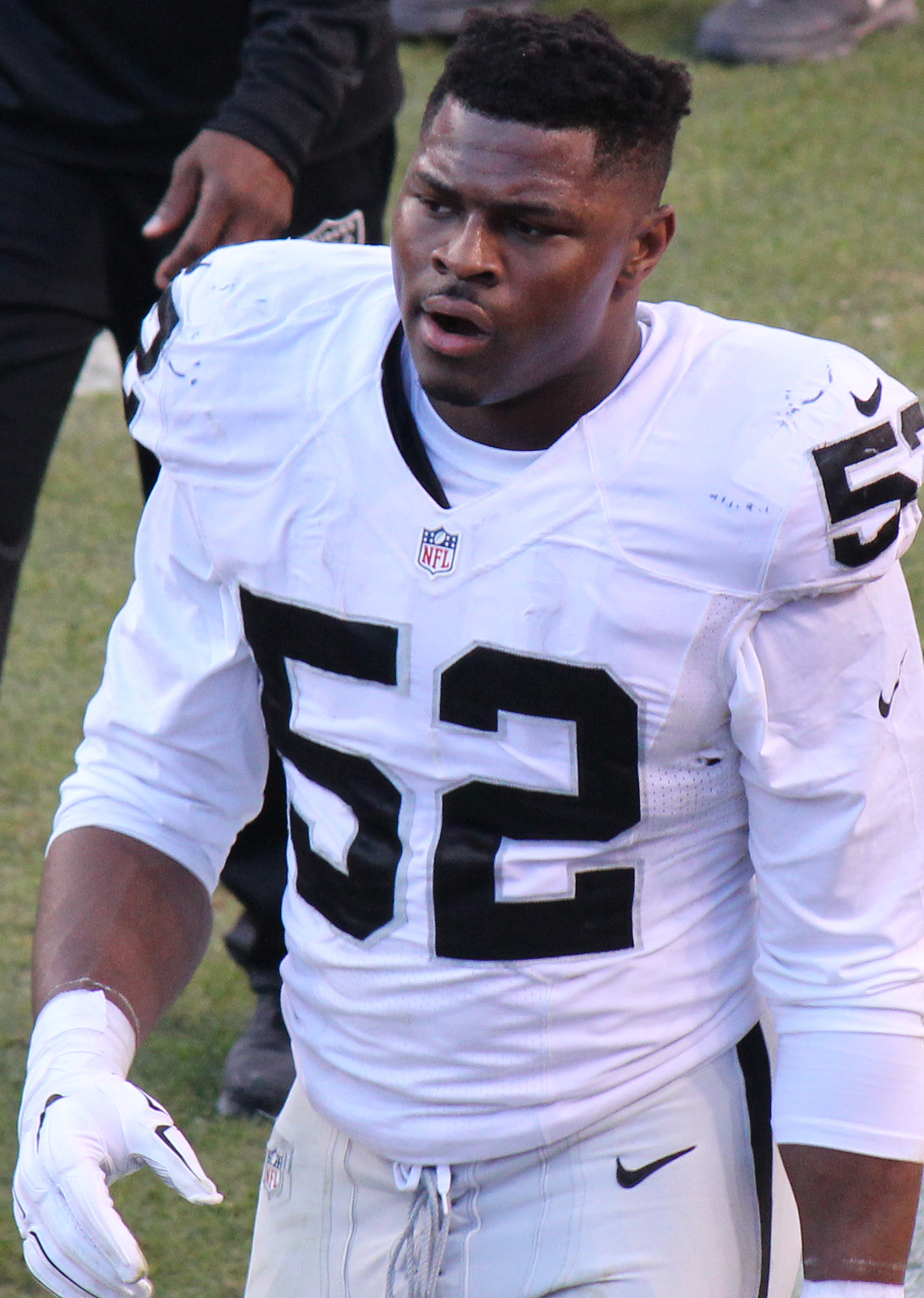
Edge rusher Khalil Mack was drafted fifth overall in the 2014 NFL draft. During his four seasons with the team, he was a two-time All-Pro, three-time Pro Bowler, and 2016 Defensive Player of the Year. He was also selected to the 2010s All-Decade Team.

Key
Symbol	Meaning
†	Inducted into the Pro Football Hall of Fame
*	Selected number one overall

Position abbreviations
C	Center
CB	Cornerback
DB	Defensive back
DE	Defensive end
DT	Defensive tackle
G	Guard
K	Placekicker
LB	Linebacker
P	Punter
QB	Quarterback
RB	Running back
S	Safety
T	Tackle
TE	Tight end
WR	Wide receiver

Las Vegas Raiders (Note: The Las Vegas Raiders were previously known as the Oakland Raiders (1960–1981, 1995–2019) and Los Angeles Raiders (1982–1994).) first-round draft picks
Season	Pick	Player	Position	College	Notes
1960	Territorial	Dale Hackbart	QB	Wisconsin	First round was territorial selections. (Note: The first round of the 1960 AFL draft was territorial selections. Teams were allowed to select a single player from a designated region (their "territory").) Signed for the NFL's Green Bay Packers instead.
1961	4	Joe Rutgens	DT	Illinois	Signed for the NFL's Washington Redskins instead
1962	2	Roman Gabriel	QB	NC State	Signed for the NFL's Los Angeles Rams instead
1963	No pick				Pick traded to Dallas Texans (Note: Las Vegas traded their 1963 first-round selection (No. 1 overall) and the rights to defensive tackle Fred Miller to the Dallas Texans in exchange for quarterback Cotton Davidson.)
1964	7	Tony Lorick	RB	Arizona State	Signed for the NFL's Baltimore Colts instead
1965	3	Harry Schuh	T	Memphis	
1966	No pick				Did not make any selections until the seventh round
1967	17	Gene Upshaw†	G	Texas A&M-Kingsville	
1968	25	Eldridge Dickey	WR	Tennessee State	
1969	22	Art Thoms	DT	Syracuse	
1970	24	Raymond Chester	TE	Morgan State	
1971	19	Jack Tatum	DB	Ohio State	
1972	21	Mike Siani	WR	Villanova	
1973	23	Ray Guy†	P	Southern Mississippi	
1974	19	Henry Lawrence	T	Florida A&M	
1975	24	Neal Colzie	DB	Ohio State	
1976	No pick				Pick traded to Green Bay Packers (Note: Las Vegas traded their 1976 first-round selection (No. 23 overall) and 1977 first-round selection (No. 28 overall) to the Green Bay Packers as compensation for linebacker Ted Hendricks.)
1977	No pick				Pick traded to Green Bay Packers
1978	No pick				Pick traded to Green Bay Packers (Note: Las Vegas traded their 1978 first-round selection (No. 26 overall), 1979 fourth-round selection (No. 103 overall), and defensive lineman Herb McMath to the Green Bay Packers in exchange for defensive tackle Mike McCoy.)
1979	No pick				Pick traded to Los Angeles Rams (Note: Las Vegas traded their 1979 first-round selection (No. 19 overall), 1980 third-round selection (No. 70 overall), and 1981 second-round selection (No. 56 overall) to the Los Angeles Rams in exchange for cornerback Monte Jackson.)
1980	15	Marc Wilson	QB	BYU	
1981	21	Ted Watts	DB	Texas Tech	Pick received from Houston Oilers (Note: Las Vegas traded tight end Dave Casper to the Houston Oilers in exchange for their 1981 first- and second-round selections (Nos. 21 and 48 overall) and 1982 second-round selection (No. 35 overall).)
1981	23	Curt Marsh	G	Washington	Moved up draft order in trade with Buffalo Bills (Note: Las Vegas traded their 1981 first- and third-round selections (Nos. 28 and 83 overall) to the Buffalo Bills in exchange for their 1981 first- and third-round selections (Nos. 28 and 83 overall).)
1982	10	Marcus Allen†	RB	USC	
1983	26	Don Mosebar	C	USC	
1984	No pick				Pick traded to New England Patriots (Note: Las Vegas traded their 1984 first-round selection (No. 28 overall) and 1985 second-round selection (No. 52 overall) to the New England Patriots in exchange for cornerback Mike Haynes.)
1985	23	Jessie Hester	WR	Florida State	
1986	24	Bob Buczkowski	DE	Pittsburgh	
1987	15	John Clay	T	Missouri	
1988	6	Tim Brown†	WR	Notre Dame	
1988	9	Terry McDaniel	DB	Tennessee	Pick received from Houston Oilers (Note: Las Vegas traded their 1988 second- and third-round selections (Nos. 48 and 60 overall) and defensive end Sean Jones to the Houston Oilers in exchange for their 1988 first-, third-, and fourth-round selections (Nos. 9, 74, and 102 overall).)
1988	25	Scott Davis	DE	Illinois	Moved up draft order in trade with San Francisco 49ers (Note: Las Vegas traded their 1988 second- and fourth-round selections (Nos. 33 and 102 overall) and wide receiver Dokie Williams to the San Francisco 49ers in exchange for their 1988 first-round selection (No. 26 overall).)
1989	No pick				Pick traded to Chicago Bears (Note: Las Vegas traded their 1989 first-round selection (No. 11 overall) and 1990 third-round selection (No. 63 overall) to the Chicago Bears in exchange for wide receiver Willie Gault.)
1990	11	Anthony Smith	DE	Arizona	
1991	24	Todd Marinovich	QB	USC	
1992	16	Chester McGlockton	DT	Clemson	
1993	12	Patrick Bates	DB	Texas A&M	
1994	22	Rob Fredrickson	LB	Michigan State	
1995	18	Napoleon Kaufman	RB	Washington	
1996	9	Rickey Dudley	TE	Ohio State	Moved down draft order in trade with Houston Oilers (Note: Las Vegas traded their 1996 first-, second-, and fourth-round selections (Nos. 17, 48, and 109 overall) to the Houston Oilers in exchange for their 1996 first-round selection (No. 9 overall).)
1997	2	Darrell Russell	DT	USC	Moved up draft order in trade with New Orleans Saints (Note: Las Vegas traded their 1997 first-, second-, and fourth-round selections (Nos. 10, 39, and 107 overall) and wide receiver Daryl Hobbs to the New Orleans Saints in exchange for their 1997 first- and sixth-round selections (Nos. 2 and 166 overall).)
1998	4	Charles Woodson†	DB	Michigan	
1998	23	Mo Collins	G	Florida	Moved up draft order in trade with Tampa Bay Buccaneers (Note: Las Vegas traded their two 1998 second-round selections (Nos. 34 and 59 overall) to the Tampa Bay Buccaneers in exchange for their 1998 first-round selection (No. 23 overall).)
1999	18	Matt Stinchcomb	G	Georgia	
2000	17	Sebastian Janikowski	K	Florida State	
2001	28	Derrick Gibson	DB	Florida State	
2002	17	Phillip Buchanon	DB	Miami	Pick received from Tampa Bay Buccaneers. (Note: Las Vegas traded head coach Jon Gruden to the Tampa Bay Buccaneers in exchange for their 2002 first- and second-round selections (Nos. 21 and 53 overall), 2003 first-round selection (No. 32 overall), 2004 second-round selection (No. 45 overall), and $8 million in cash.) Moved up draft order in trades with Washington Redskins (Note: Las Vegas traded a 2002 first-, received from the Tampa Bay Buccaneers, and third-round selection (Nos. 21 and 89 overall) to the Washington Redskins in exchange for their 2002 first-round selection (No. 18 overall).) and Atlanta Falcons. (Note: Las Vegas traded a 2002 first-, received from the Washington Redskins, and fifth-round selection (Nos. 18 and 158 overall) to the Atlanta Falcons in exchange for their 2002 first-round selection (No. 17 overall).)
2002	23	Napoleon Harris	LB	Northwestern	
2003	31	Nnamdi Asomugha	DB	California	
2003	32	Tyler Brayton	DE	Colorado	Pick received from Tampa Bay Buccaneers
2004	2	Robert Gallery	T	Iowa	
2005	23	Fabian Washington	DB	Nebraska	Original pick traded to Minnesota Vikings. (Note: Las Vegas traded their 2005 first- and seventh-round selections (Nos. 7 and 219 overall) and linebacker Napoleon Harris to the Minnesota Vikings in exchange for wide receiver Randy Moss.) Pick received from New York Jets. (Note: Las Vegas traded a 2005 second- and two sixth-round selections (Nos. 47, 182, and 185 overall) and tight end Doug Jolley to the New York Jets in exchange for their 2005 first- and seventh-round selections (Nos. 26 and 230 overall).) Moved up draft order in trade with Seattle Seahawks. (Note: Las Vegas traded a 2005 first-, received from the New York Jets, and fifth-round selection (Nos. 26 and 105 overall) to the Seattle Seahawks in exchange for their 2005 first-round selection (No. 23 overall).)
2006	7	Michael Huff	DB	Texas	
2007	1	JaMarcus Russell*	QB	LSU	
2008	4	Darren McFadden	RB	Arkansas	
2009	7	Darrius Heyward-Bey	WR	Maryland	
2010	8	Rolando McClain	LB	Alabama	
2011	No pick				Pick traded to New England Patriots (Note: Las Vegas traded their 2011 first-round selection (No. 17 overall) to the New England Patriots in exchange for defensive lineman Richard Seymour.)
2012	No pick				Pick traded to Cincinnati Bengals (Note: Las Vegas traded their 2012 first-round selection (No. 17 overall) and 2013 second-round selection (No. 37 overall) to the Cincinnati Bengals in exchange for quarterback Carson Palmer.)
2013	12	D. J. Hayden	DB	Houston	Moved down draft order in trade with Miami Dolphins (Note: Las Vegas traded their 2013 first-round selection (No. 3 overall) to the Miami Dolphins in exchange for their 2013 first- and second-round selections (Nos. 12 and 42 overall).)
2014	5	Khalil Mack	LB	Buffalo	
2015	4	Amari Cooper	WR	Alabama	
2016	14	Karl Joseph	S	West Virginia	
2017	24	Gareon Conley	CB	Ohio State	
2018	15	Kolton Miller	T	UCLA	Moved down draft order in trade with Arizona Cardinals (Note: Las Vegas traded their 2018 first-round selection (No. 10 overall) to the Arizona Cardinals in exchange for their 2018 first-, third-, and fifth-round selections (Nos. 15, 79, and 152 overall).)
2019	4	Clelin Ferrell	DE	Clemson	
2019	24	Josh Jacobs	RB	Alabama	Pick received from Chicago Bears (Note: Las Vegas traded their 2020 second- and seventh-round selections (Nos. 43 and 226 overall) and linebacker Khalil Mack to the Chicago Bears in exchange for their 2019 first- and sixth-round selections (Nos. 24 and 196 overall) and 2020 first- and third-round selections (Nos. 19 and 81 overall).)
2019	27	Johnathan Abram	S	Mississippi State	Pick received from Dallas Cowboys (Note: Las Vegas traded wide receiver Amari Cooper to the Dallas Cowboys in exchange for their 2019 first-round selection (No. 27 overall).)
2020	12	Henry Ruggs	WR	Alabama	
2020	19	Damon Arnette	CB	Ohio State	Pick received from Chicago Bears
2021	17	Alex Leatherwood	T	Alabama	
2022	No pick				Pick traded to Green Bay Packers (Note: Las Vegas traded their 2022 first- and second-round selections (Nos. 22 and 53 overall) to the Green Bay Packers in exchange for wide receiver Davante Adams.)
2023	7	Tyree Wilson	DE	Texas Tech	
2024	13	Brock Bowers	TE	Georgia	
2025	6	Ashton Jeanty	RB	Boise State	
2026	1	Fernando Mendoza*	QB	Indiana	

== See also ==
- History of the Las Vegas Raiders
- List of Las Vegas Raiders seasons
