= 2012 Auburn Tigers football team =

American college football season

2012 Auburn Tigers football
- Conference: Southeastern Conference
- Western Division
- Record: 3–9 (0–8 SEC)
- Head coach: Gene Chizik (4th season)
- Offensive coordinator: Scot Loeffler (1st season)
- Offensive scheme: Pro-style
- Defensive coordinator: Brian VanGorder (1st season)
- Base defense: 4–3, Tampa 2
- Home stadium: Jordan–Hare Stadium

2012 Southeastern Conference football standings
	Conf.			Overall
Team	W		L	W		L
Eastern Division
No. T–5 Georgia xy	7	–	1	12	–	2
No. 9 Florida x%	7	–	1	11	–	2
No. 8 South Carolina	6	–	2	11	–	2
No. 23 Vanderbilt	5	–	3	9	–	4
Missouri	2	–	6	5	–	7
Tennessee	1	–	7	5	–	7
Kentucky	0	–	8	2	–	10
Western Division
No. 1 Alabama x$#	7	–	1	13	–	1
No. 14 LSU *	6	–	2	10	–	3
No. T–5 Texas A&M	6	–	2	11	–	2
Mississippi State	4	–	4	8	–	5
Ole Miss *	3	–	5	7	–	6
Arkansas	2	–	6	4	–	8
Auburn	0	–	8	3	–	9
Championship: Alabama 32, Georgia 28
# – BCS National Champion; $ – BCS representative as conference champion; % – BCS at-large representative; x – Division champion/co-champions; y – Championship game participant; * Ole Miss and LSU vacated all wins due to NCAA violations.; Rankings from AP Poll

The 2012 Auburn Tigers football team represented Auburn University in the 2012 NCAA Division I FBS football season. The team was coached by Gene Chizik, who was in his fourth season with Auburn. The Tigers played their home games at Jordan–Hare Stadium in Auburn, Alabama, and competed in the Western Division of the Southeastern Conference (SEC).

On November 25, 2012, Auburn athletic director Jay Jacobs fired head coach Chizik and all of the assistant coaches after finishing the season 3–9 overall with a 0–8 record in SEC play, the program's worst season in 60 years.

== Forthcoming season ==
A shooting at an off campus party killed former players Ed Christian and LaDarius Phillips on June 9 after they had planned to transfer. Current Offensive Guard Eric Mack was also shot but survived, he remains on the team, but has not participated in summer drills. Freshman QB Zeke Pike was arrested for public intoxication and was dismissed from the team. Pike will transfer to Louisville. Other transfers included CB Jonathan Rose and OG Thomas O'Reilly. DE Joel Bonomolo quit the team and linebacker Jawara White suffered a career ending neck injury. Transfers Corey Grant, Mike Blakely and Melvin Ray were not eligible to play that upcoming season.

== New coordinators ==
The Tigers played the 2012 season with new coordinators on both offense and defense. On offense, Scot Loeffler took control. Loeffler was previously the offensive coordinator at Temple University, and had served stints as an assistant coach at Michigan, Florida and the Detroit Lions. While serving as a graduate assistant coach at Michigan, Loeffler tutored future New England Patriots quarterback Tom Brady.

The new Auburn defensive coordinator was Brian VanGorder, who most recently served in a similar capacity with the Atlanta Falcons. Also new to the Tigers defensive coaching staff was Willie Martinez, who coached defensive backs. Martinez was previously an assistant coach at Oklahoma. VanGorder and Martinez previously coached together at Georgia in the early 2000s. The Tigers switched to a more aggressive blitzing scheme on defense. The presence of VanGorder on the Tigers’ coaching staff paid dividends in recruiting, as they secured commitments from several high-profile recruits for the 2013 class.

== Coaching staff ==
Name	Position	Alma mater	Year entering
Gene Chizik	Head coach	Florida	4th
Scot Loeffler	Offensive coordinator/quarterbacks	Michigan	1st
Brian VanGorder	Defensive coordinator	Wayne State	1st
Trooper Taylor	Assistant head coach/wide receivers	Baylor	4th
Curtis Luper	Running backs/recruiting coordinator	Stephen F. Austin	4th
Jeff Grimes	Offensive line	UTEP	4th
Jay Boulware	Special teams Coordinator/Tight ends	Texas	4th
Mike Pelton	Defensive line	Auburn	2nd
Willie Martinez	Secondary	Miami	1st
Tommy Thigpen	Linebackers	North Carolina	4th
Kevin Yoxall	Head Strength and Conditioning Coach	TCU	13th

=== Returning starters ===
==== Offense ====
Player	Class	Position
Kiehl Frazier	Sophomore	Quarterback
Tre Mason	Sophomore	Running Back
Onterio McCalebb	Senior	Running Back
Emory Blake	Senior	Wide Receiver
Quan Bray	Sophomore	Wide Receiver
Travante Stallworth	Senior	Wide Receiver
Trovon Reed	Sophomore	Slot Receiver
Philip Lutzenkirchen	Senior	Tight End
Reese Dismukes	Sophomore	Center
John Sullen	Senior	Left Guard
Chad Slade	Sophomore	Right Tackle

==== Defense ====
Player	Class	Position
Corey Lemonier	Junior	Defensive End
Dee Ford	Junior	Defensive End
Jeff Whitaker	Junior	Defensive Tackle
Gabe Wright	Sophomore	Defensive Tackle
Daren Bates	Senior	Weak Side Linebacker
T'Sharvin Bell	Senior	Cornerback
Chris Davis	Junior	Cornerback
Demetruce McNeal	Junior	Strong Safety
Enrique Florence	Sophomore	Free Safety
Jermaine Whitehead	Sophomore	Nickelback
Robenson Therezie	Sophomore	Nickelback

==== Special teams ====
Player	Class	Position
Jason Lembke	Sophomore	Long Snapper
Steven Clark	Junior	Punter
Cody Parkey	Junior	Kicker
Ryan White	Junior	Holder
Tre Mason	Sophomore	Kick returner
Onterio McCalebb	Senior	Kick returner
Quan Bray	Sophomore	Punt returner

== Key losses ==
=== Coaches ===
- AHC/OC Gus Malzahn
- DC Ted Roof

=== Players ===
- QB Barrett Trotter
- RB Michael Dyer
- WR Quindarrius Carr
- LT A.J. Greene
- RT Brandon Mosely
- LB Eltoro Freeman
- FS Neiko Thorpe

== Key returners ==
- QB Kiehl Frazier
- QB Clint Moseley
- RB Onterio McCalebb
- RB Tre Mason
- WR Emory Blake
- TE Philip Lutzenkirchen
- C Reese Dismukes
- LE Corey Lemonier
- LE Craig Sanders
- LE LaDarius Owens
- RE Dee Ford
- RE Nosa Equae
- DT Jeff Whitaker
- LB Daren Bates
- CB Chris Davis
- CB T'Sharvin Bell
- P Steven Clark
- K Cody Parkey

== Depth chart ==
Offense

Quarterbacks

- 10 Kiehl Frazier So 6'2 228
- 15 Clint Moseley Jr 6'4 233
- 12 Jonathan Wallace Fr 6'2 205

Running backs

- 23 Onterio McCalebb Sr 5'11 168
- 21 Tre Mason So 5'10 205
- 20 Corey Grant So 5'9 203
- 22 Mike Blakely RFr 5'9 206

Fullbacks

- 35 Jay Prosch Jr 6'0 253
- 48 Blake Burgess Jr 6'2 255

Slot receivers

- 1 Trovon Reed So 6'0 188
- 4 Quan Bray So 5'10 175
- 8 Anthony Morgan Sr 5'9 204

Wide Receiver

- 80 Emory Blake Sr 6'2 197
- 13 Sammie Coates RFr 6'3 210
- 89 Jaylon Denson So 6'3 208
- 6 Ricardo Louis Fr 6'2 210

Wide receiver

- 85 Travante Stallworth Sr 5'9 195
- 82 Melvin Ray Fr 6'4 205
- 87 JaQuay Williams Fr 6'4 201

Tight end

- 43 Philip Lutzenkirchen Sr 6'4 260
- 11 Brandon Fulse So 6'5 250
- 81 C. J. Uzomah So 6'4 246 (was the wildcat last year)
- 46 Ricky Parks Fr 6'3 237
- 84 Darrien Hutcherson Fr 6'8 272

Left Tackle

- 73 Greg Robinson RFr 6'4 312
- 72 Shon Coleman RFR 6'6 295
- 77 Shane Callahan Fr 6'6 285

Left Guard

- 71 John Sullen Sr 6'6 336
- 63 Alex Kozan Fr 6'4 295
- 76 Jordan Diamond Fr 6'5 295

Center

- 50 Reese Dismukes So 6'3 305
- 65 Tunde Fariyike So 6'3 302

Right Guard

- 75 Christian Westerman RFr 6'3 310
- 60 Eric Mack So 6'3 315
- 70 Robert Leff Fr 6'7 275

Right Tackle

- 62 Chad Slade So 6'5 325
- 51 Patrick Miller Fr 6'7 275
- 56 Avery Young Fr 6'6 275
- 74 Will Adams Fr 6'8 285

Defense

Left End

- 55 Corey Lemonier Jr 6'4 250
- 13 Craig Sanders Jr 6'4 266
- 10 Ladarius Owens So 6'2 257
- 42 Gimel President Fr 6'4 245

Defensive tackle

- 54 Jeff Whitaker Jr 6'5 305
- 92 Ken Carter Jr 6'4 297
- 74 Jamar Travis Sr 6'0 294
- 91 Tyler Nero Fr 6'2 291

Defensive tackle

- 90 Gabe Wright So 6'3 305
- 98 Angelo Blackson So 6'5 325
- 95 Devaunte Singler So 6'5 295
- 93 JaBrain Niles RFr 6'2 297

Right End

- 95 Dee Ford Jr 6'2 245
- 94 Nosa Equae Jr 6'3 263
- 52 Justin Delaine So 6'5 250
- 45 Keymiya Harrell RFr 6'5 260

Strong Side Linebacker

- 17 Kris Frost RFr 6'2 233
- 35 Jonathan Evans 5'11 230
- 44 Anthony Swain 6'2 245

Middle Linebacker

- 5 Jake Holland Jr 6'1 238
- 33 Chris Landrum RFr 6'3 233
- 30 Cassanova McKinzy Fr 6'4 237

Weak Side Linebacker

- 25 Daren Bates Sr 5'11 225
- 26 Justin Garrett So 6'2 206
- 58 Ashton Richardson Sr 6'1 218
- 18 Javiere Mitchell Fr 6'2 197

Left Corner Back

- 11 Chris Davis Jr 5'10 184
- 6 Jonathan Mincy So 5'10 188
- 1 Josh Hoseley Fr 5'9 175
- 21 Jonathan Jones Fr 5'10 185

Free Safety

- 14 Enrique Florence So 6'1 185
- 9 Jermaine Whitehead So 5'11 195
- 31 Trent Fisher So 6'1 187

Strong Safety

- 12 DeMutruce McNeal Jr 6'2 193
- 24 Ryan Smith Jr 6'2 208
- 16 Ikeem Means Sr 6'0 205

Right Corner Back

- 22 T'Sharvin Bell Sr 6'0 182
- 27 Robensen Theirize So 5'8 203
- 19 Ryan White Jr 5'11 195
- 28 TJ Davis Fr 6'1 190

Special Teams

- K 36 Cody Parkey Jr 6'1 175
- P 30 Steven Clarke Jr 6'5 228
- LS 59 Jason Lembke Jr 6'2 242
- H 19 Ryan White Jr 5'11 195
- LS 61 C.T. Moorman Fr 6'1 220
- PR 20 Corey Grant So 5'9 203
- KR 20 Corey Grant So 5'9 203
- KR 4 Quan Bray So 5'10 175

Team Captains

- Emory Blake
- Philip Lutzenkirchen
- Corey Lemonier

Award Finalists

- Maxwell Award- Onterio McCalebb
- Doak Walker Award- Onterio McCalebb
- Paul Hornung Award-Onterio McCalebb
- Johnny Rodgers Award-Onterio McCalebb
- Fred Biletnikoff Award- Emory Blake
- John Mackey Award-Philip Lutzenkirchen
- Dave Rimington Trophy- Reese Dismukes
- Chuck Bednarik Award- Corey Lemonier
- Bronko Nagurski Trophy-Corey Lemonier
- Ted Hendricks Award-Corey Lemonier
- Lombardi Award-Corey Lemonier
- Butkus Award-Daren Bates
- Lou Groza Award-Cody Parkey
- Ray Guy Award- Steven Clarke (was finalist last year)

== Recruiting class ==
The main focus in offseason recruiting was adding new offensive linemen. The Tigers signed seven, led by tackles Avery Young and Jordan Diamond, who were both rated five stars by Scouts.com. Parade All-American Shane Callahan and Patrick Miller, both rated as four star recruits, also highlight the recruiting class, as do tackle Will Adams and guard Robert Leff. The final signee to Auburn's impressive class of offensive linemen is Alex Kozan, who signed with the Tigers three weeks after the National Signing Day. In addition, 2010 signee Shon Coleman has been cleared to play after being cured of acute leukemia. He will have four years of eligibility remaining.

The only high school running back signed was Jovon Robinson; however, he was unable to practice until potential irregularities in his high school transcripts are resolved. Three running backs transferred to the Tigers from other programs: Mike Blakely (Florida), Corey Grant (Alabama) and fullback Jay Prosch (Illinois).

The Tigers added two four-star recruits at wide receiver. Ricardo Louis signed with Auburn, picking the Tigers over Florida State; also, the Tigers beat out Georgia Tech for the services of JaQuay Williams. In addition, Melvin Ray transferred from Alabama. The Tigers also signed two tight ends: highly regarded Ricky Parks and Darrien Hutchinson.

On defense, Auburn concentrated on the secondary, picking up four-star recruit Josh Hosely as well as T.J. Davis and Jonathan Jones. Defensive line signees include Parade All-American Gimel President and four-star recruit Tyler Nero, who has been timed running a 40-yard dash in 4.62 seconds. Linebackers Cassanova McKinzy and Javier Mitchell round out the class.

== Schedule ==
Date	Time	Opponent	Site	TV	Result	Attendance
September 1	6:00 p.m.	vs. No. 14 Clemson*	Georgia Dome; Atlanta, GA (rivalry) (Chick-fil-A Kickoff Game)	ESPN	L 19–26	75,211
September 8	11:00 a.m.	at Mississippi State	Davis Wade Stadium; Starkville, MS	ESPN	L 10–28	56,111
September 15	11:21 a.m.	Louisiana–Monroe*	Jordan–Hare Stadium; Auburn, AL	SECN/ESPN3	W 31–28 ^{OT}	85,214
September 22	6:00 p.m.	No. 2 LSU	Jordan–Hare Stadium; Auburn, AL (Tiger Bowl)	ESPN	L 10–12	86,721
October 6	11:00 a.m.	Arkansas	Jordan–Hare Stadium; Auburn, AL	ESPN2	L 7–24	85,813
October 13	11:21 a.m.	at Ole Miss	Vaught–Hemingway Stadium; Oxford, MS (rivalry)	SECN/ESPN3	L 20–41	57,068
October 20	11:21 a.m.	at Vanderbilt	Vanderbilt Stadium; Nashville, TN	SECN/ESPN3	L 13–17	40,350
October 27	6:00 p.m.	No. 20 Texas A&M	Jordan–Hare Stadium; Auburn, AL	ESPNU	L 21–63	85,119
November 3	11:30 a.m.	New Mexico State*^{†}	Jordan–Hare Stadium; Auburn, AL	CSS/ESPN3	W 42–7	74,676
November 10	7:00 p.m.	No. 6 Georgia	Jordan–Hare Stadium; Auburn, AL (Deep South's Oldest Rivalry)	ESPN2	L 0–38	86,146
November 17	1:00 p.m.	Alabama A&M*	Jordan–Hare Stadium; Auburn, AL	PPV	W 51–7	74,832
November 24	2:30 p.m.	at No. 2 Alabama	Bryant–Denny Stadium; Tuscaloosa, AL (Iron Bowl)	CBS	L 0–49	101,821
*Non-conference game; ^{†}Homecoming; Rankings from Coaches' Poll released prior to the game; All times are in Central time

Schedule source:

== Game summaries ==
=== #14 Clemson ===
#14 Clemson Tigers vs. Auburn Tigers (Chick-fil-A Kickoff Game)

Quarter	1	2	3	4	Total
#14 Clemson Tigers	3	10	3	10	26
Auburn Tigers	7	3	6	3	19

at Georgia Dome, Atlanta, Georgia

- Date: September 1
- Game time: 6:05 pm
- Game weather: Indoors
- Game attendance: 75,211
- Referee: Jeff Flanagan
- TV announcers (ESPN): Brad Nessler, Todd Blackledge and Holly Rowe

=== Mississippi State ===
Auburn Tigers at Mississippi State Bulldogs

Quarter	1	2	3	4	Total
Tigers	0	3	7	0	10
Bulldogs	0	7	14	7	28

at Davis Wade Stadium, Starkville, MS

- Date: September 8
- Game time: 11:01 am
- Game weather: 74°, Wind NW 10 mph, Partly Cloudy
- Game attendance: 56,111
- Referee: Hubert Owens
- TV announcers (ESPN): Dave Pasch, Brian Griese and Jenn Brown

=== Louisiana-Monroe ===
Louisiana-Monroe Warhawks at Auburn Tigers

Quarter	1	2	3	4	OT	Total
Warhawks	7	7	0	14	0	28
Tigers	7	14	7	0	3	31

at Jordan–Hare Stadium, Auburn, AL

- Date: September 15
- Game time: 11:21 am
- Game weather: 81°, Wind E 4 mph, Sunny
- Game attendance: 85,214
- Referee: Marc Curles
- TV announcers (SEC Network): Dave Neal, Andre Ware, and Cara Capuano

=== #2 LSU ===
LSU Tigers at Auburn Tigers (Tiger Bowl)

Quarter	1	2	3	4	Total
#3 LSU Tigers	9	0	3	0	12
Auburn Tigers	7	3	0	0	10

at Jordan–Hare Stadium, Auburn, AL

- Date: September 22
- Game time: 6:06 pm
- Game weather: 82°, Calm, Sunny
- Game attendance: 86,721
- Referee: Tom Ritter
- TV announcers (ESPN): Brad Nessler, Todd Blackledge, and Holly Rowe

=== Arkansas ===
Arkansas Razorbacks at Auburn Tigers

Quarter	1	2	3	4	Total
Razorbacks	7	3	0	14	24
Tigers	0	0	7	0	7

at Jordan–Hare Stadium, Auburn, AL

- Date: October 6
- Game time: 11:01 am
- Game weather: 75°, Calm, Mostly Sunny
- Game attendance: 85,813
- Referee: Matt Loeffler
- TV announcers (ESPN): Beth Mowins, Joey Galloway and Tom Luginbill

=== Ole Miss ===
Auburn Tigers at Ole Miss Rebels

Quarter	1	2	3	4	Total
Tigers	0	17	3	0	20
Rebels	14	3	7	17	41

at Vaught–Hemingway Stadium, Oxford, MS

- Date: October 13
- Game time: 11:21 am
- Game weather: 72°, Wind S 3 mph, Fair
- Game attendance: 57,068
- Referee: Ken Williamson
- TV announcers (SEC Network): Dave Neal (play-by-play), Andre Ware (color), Cara Capuano (sideline)

=== Vanderbilt ===
Auburn Tigers at Vanderbilt Commodores

Quarter	1	2	3	4	Total
Tigers	0	10	0	3	13
Commodores	7	3	7	0	17

at Vanderbilt Stadium, Nashville, TN

- Date: October 20
- Game time: 11:21 am
- Game weather: 59°, Wind NW 9 mph, Cloudy
- Game attendance: 40,350
- Referee: Matt Moore
- TV announcers (SEC Network): Dave Neal, Andre Ware, and Cara Capuano

=== #20 Texas A&M ===
Texas A&M Aggies at Auburn Tigers

Quarter	1	2	3	4	Total
#20 Aggies	21	21	14	7	63
Tigers	0	7	14	0	21

at Jordan–Hare Stadium, Auburn, AL

- Date: October 27
- Game time: 6:08 pm
- Game weather: 63°, Wind WNW 12 mph, Partly Cloudy
- Game attendance: 85,119
- Referee: Matt Austin
- TV announcers (ESPNU): Clay Matvick, Matt Stinchcomb, and Allison Williams

=== New Mexico State ===
New Mexico State Aggies at Auburn Tigers

Quarter	1	2	3	4	Total
Aggies	0	0	0	7	7
Tigers	0	7	21	14	42

at Jordan–Hare Stadium, Auburn, AL

- Date: November 3
- Game time: 11:36 am
- Game weather: 71°, Calm, Sunny
- Game attendance: 74,676
- Referee: Penn Wagers
- TV announcers (CSS): Matt Stewart, Chris Doering, and Angela Mallen

=== #7 Georgia ===
Georgia Bulldogs at Auburn Tigers (Deep South's Oldest Rivalry)

Quarter	1	2	3	4	Total
#7 Bulldogs	14	14	10	0	38
Tigers	0	0	0	0	0

at Jordan–Hare Stadium, Auburn, AL

- Date: November 10
- Game time: 6:06 pm
- Game weather: 62°, Calm, Clear and Cool
- Game attendance: 86,146
- Referee: Matt Austin
- TV announcers (ESPN2): Mark Jones, Brock Huard, and Allison Williams

=== Alabama A&M ===
Alabama A&M Bulldogs at Auburn Tigers

Quarter	1	2	3	4	Total
Bulldogs	0	0	7	0	7
Tigers	21	14	0	16	51

at Jordan–Hare Stadium, Auburn, AL

- Date: November 17
- Game time: 1:05 pm
- Game weather: 55°, Wind NNE 16 mph, Sunny and Breezy
- Game attendance: 74,832
- Referee: Jason McArthur
- TV announcers (PPV): Andy Burcham and Ben Leard

=== Alabama ===
Auburn Tigers at #2 Alabama Crimson Tide (Iron Bowl)

Quarter	1	2	3	4	Total
Tigers	0	0	0	0	0
#2 Crimson Tide	14	28	7	0	49

at Bryant–Denny Stadium, Tuscaloosa, Alabama

- Date: November 24
- Game time: 2:40 pm
- Game weather: 53°, Sunny Skies, Winds NW 8 mph
- Game attendance: 101,821
- Referee: Matt Moore
- TV announcers (CBS): Verne Lundquist (play-by-play), Gary Danielson (color), Tracy Wolfson (sideline)

Team	1	2	Total
{{{Visitor}}}	{{{V1}}}	{{{V2}}}	0
{{{Host}}}	{{{H1}}}	{{{H2}}}	0

Scoring summary
1	11:07	Alabama	Eddie Lacy 2-yard run (Jeremy Shelley kick)	Alabama 7–0
1	5:01	Alabama	T. J. Yeldon 2-yard run (Jeremy Shelley kick)	Alabama 14–0
2	12:38	Alabama	Amari Cooper 37-yard pass from A. J. McCarron (Jeremy Shelley kick)	Alabama 21–0
2	8:39	Alabama	Kevin Norwood 7-yard pass from A. J. McCarron (Jeremy Shelley kick)	Alabama 28–0
2	4:43	Alabama	Eddie Lacy 1-yard run (Jeremy Shelley kick)	Alabama 35–0
2	0:31	Alabama	Amari Cooper 29-yard pass from A. J. McCarron (Jeremy Shelley kick)	Alabama 42–0
3	9:03	Alabama	Kevin Norwood 38-yard pass from A. J. McCarron (Jeremy Shelley kick)	Alabama 49–0

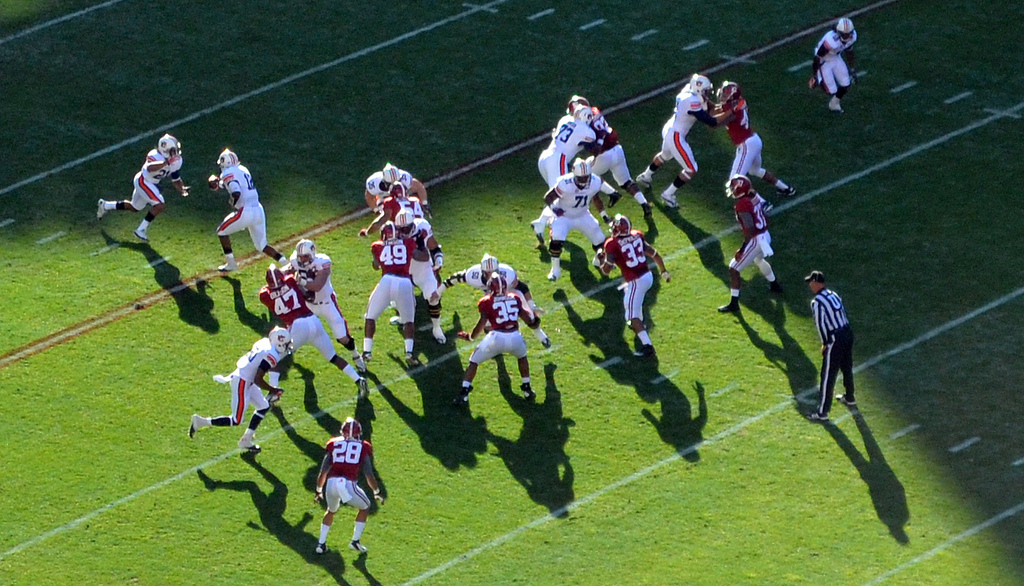
The Alabama defense in motion against the Tigers' offense.

In the 2012 edition of the Iron Bowl, Alabama shutout the Auburn Tigers 49–0 at Tuscaloosa. The Crimson Tide opened the game with a 10-play, 75-yard drive that culminated in a two-yard Eddie Lacy touchdown run and a 7–0 lead. After the Alabama defense held Auburn to a three-and-out on their first possession, their offense responded with their second touchdown of the afternoon on a two-yard T. J. Yeldon touchdown run for a 14–0 lead. The Crimson Tide then forced a Tigers' punt on their second possession, and then scored their third touchdown in as many possessions when A. J. McCarron threw a 37-yard pass to Amari Cooper for a 21–0 lead early in the second quarter.

On the Auburn possession that ensued, the Alabama defense collected their first turnover of the game when Robert Lester intercepted a Jonathan Wallace pass at the Tigers' 29-yard line. Five plays later the Crimson Tide led 28–0 after McCarron threw a seven-yard touchdown pass to Kevin Norwood. The Alabama defense held Auburn to their second three-and-out of the game, and then the Crimson Tide scored their fifth touchdown of the game on a one-yard Lacy run for a 35–0 lead. Auburn then committed their second turnover of the game when Nico Johnson forced a Tre Mason fumble that Dee Milliner recovered and returned to the Tigers' 35-yard line. Alabama then took a 42–0 halftime lead when McCarron threw a 29-yard touchdown pass to Cooper.

With the Alabama starters in the game for the first possession of the second half, the defense again held the Tigers to a three-and-out and forced a punt. The offense then made it seven-for-seven on offense when McCarron threw a 38-yard touchdown pass to Norwood for a 49–0 lead. The Alabama defense then did not allow Auburn to get past their own 41-yard line for the duration of the game and secured their fourth shutout of the season. This marked the second consecutive Iron Bowl in which Auburn's offense was unable to score against Alabama's defense. The victory was the second largest in the history of the Iron Bowl after the 55–0 Alabama win in 1948 and improved Alabama's all-time record against the Tigers to 42–34–1.

== Rankings ==
Ranking movements Legend: ██ Increase in ranking ██ Decrease in ranking — = Not ranked RV = Received votes
	Week															
Poll	Pre	1	2	3	4	5	6	7	8	9	10	11	12	13	14	Final
AP	RV	RV	—	—	—	—	—	—	—	—	—	—	—	—	—	—
Coaches	25	RV	—	—	—	—	—	—	—	—	—	—	—	—	—	—
Harris	Not released						—	—	—	—	—	—	—	—	—	Not released
BCS	Not released							—	—	—	—	—	—	—	—	Not released
