= NFL receiving yards leaders =

NFL receiving yards leaders may refer to:

- List of NFL annual receiving yards leaders
- List of NFL career receiving yards leaders
