= NFL receiving touchdowns leaders =

NFL receiving touchdowns leaders may refer to:

- List of NFL annual receiving touchdowns leaders
- List of NFL career receiving touchdowns leaders
