= NFL receptions leaders =

NFL receptions leaders may refer to:

- List of NFL annual receptions leaders
- List of NFL career receptions leaders
