= Philip Lutzenkirchen =

American football player (1991–2014)

No. 43
- Position: Tight end

Personal information
- Born: June 1, 1991; Winfield, Illinois, U.S.
- Died: June 29, 2014 (aged 23); LaGrange, Georgia, U.S.
- Listed height: 6 ft 3 in (1.91 m)
- Listed weight: 258 lb (117 kg)

Career information
- High school: Lassiter (Marietta, Georgia)
- College: Auburn (2009–2012)
- NFL draft: 2013: undrafted

Career history
- St. Louis Rams (2013)*
- * Offseason or practice squad member only

Awards and highlights
- BCS national champion (2011)

Philip Lutzenkirchen (June 1, 1991 – June 29, 2014) was an American football tight end, who played at Auburn University, finishing his career as the school's all-time leading receiver in touchdowns among tight ends.

== College career ==
Lutzenkirchen was a standout tight end at Auburn, starting for the 2010 championship team as a sophomore. His senior season in 2012 ended prematurely due to a hip injury. Lutzenkirchen ended his career with 59 receptions for 628 yards, and 14 touchdowns, the most in school history by a tight end.

=== Statistics ===
Year	Team	GP	Receiving				Fumbles	
Year	Team	GP	Rec	Yds	Avg	TD	Fum	Lost
2009	Auburn	13	5	66	13.2	2	0	0
2010	Auburn	13	15	185	12.3	5	0	0
2011	Auburn	12	24	238	9.9	7	0	0
2012	Auburn	6	15	139	9.3	0	0	0
Career		44	59	628	10.6	14	0	0

== Death ==
Philip Lutzenkirchen and baseball player Joseph Ian Davis, the driver of the vehicle, were involved in a single-vehicle accident that resulted in their deaths on June 29, 2014, around 3 a.m. They both died at the scene while the two other passengers were injured. Lutzenkirchen, who was in the back seat, registered a blood alcohol level of 0.377 while Davis registered a 0.17 (the legal limit in Georgia is 0.08) which made them both legally drunk. Lutzenkirchen was ejected as a result of not wearing a seat belt.

== Lutzie 43 Foundation ==
In the aftermath of Lutzenkirchen's death, his family set up a foundation, the Lutzie 43 Foundation. The Foundation offers a "43 Lessons to Legacy" character-building curriculum. Students who complete the program are eligible to apply for a scholarship.
