= Lassiter High School =

Public high school in Marietta, Georgia, United States

Location
- 2601 Shallowford Road; Marietta, Georgia 30066; United States; 34°02′27″N 84°28′19″W

Information
- Type: Public high school
- Motto: Reaching Excellence and Climbing Higher
- Established: 1981; 45 years ago
- School district: Cobb County School District
- Principal: Dr. Chris Richie
- Teaching staff: 110.60 (FTE)
- Grades: 9–12
- Enrollment: 1,949 (2023–2024)
- Student to teacher ratio: 17.62
- Campus type: Suburban
- Colors: Maroon and Gold
- Nickname: Trojans
- Publication: Arête (literary magazine)
- Newspaper: The Laureate
- Yearbook: The Odyssey
- Website: www.cobbk12.org/lassiter

Lassiter High School is a public high school located north of Atlanta in unincorporated Cobb County, Georgia, with a Marietta post office address. A part of the Cobb County School District, the school was founded in 1981. The school colors are gold and maroon, and the school mascot is the Trojan.

== History ==
Lassiter High School was established in 1981. It was awarded the Georgia Public School of Excellence award in 1992, 1999, 2008, and 2010. In 2000, it was named a National Blue Ribbon School of Excellence.

The school was named for Leamond N. Lassiter, who was a member of the Cobb County Board of Education for 12 years.

== Demographics ==
The demographic breakdown of the 2005 students enrolled in 2026–2027 was:

- Male - 49%
- Female - 51%
- Native American/Alaskan - 0.3%
- Asian - 8.4%
- Black - 7.3%
- Hispanic - 11.7%
- White - 66.6%
- Multiracial - 5.7%

Native Hawaiian/Pacific Islander is not included in this breakdown due to an enrollment of 0%.

14% of the students were eligible for free or reduced lunch.

== Sports and clubs ==
The school's first team state championship was in girls' cross country, won in fall 1982. More recently, the baseball team has been the state runner-up seven times in their nine appearances in the state finals. The boys' soccer team was ranked first in the nation during the beginning of the spring season.

=== Music ===
The Lassiter Marching Trojan Band won the Bands of America Grand National Championships in 1998 and 2002. The marching band took part in the Macy's Thanksgiving Day Parade in 1999, 2004, and 2010. The marching band also took part in the Rose Parade in Pasadena, California on New Year's Day in 1988, 2001, 2005, 2013, and 2019. The Lassiter Marching Trojan Band also participated in the 1986 and 1995 Orange Bowl Parade. The Band is a 2-time recipient of the John Philip Sousa Foundation's Sudler Flag of Honor in 1988 and 1998.

=== Sports ===
- Baseball (1999 & 2006 State Champions)
- Basketball
- Cheerleading (1996 AAAA State Champions)
- Cross Country (State Championships: boys' 1988; girls' 82, 83, 84, 86, 87, 93)
- Equestrian
- Fastpitch softball (State Champions 2007)
- Fencing (club sport)
- Football
- Golf (girls' State Champions 2001)
- Gymnastics (girls') (2010 State Champions)
- Lacrosse (2004 Co-State Champions, 2006 State Champions, 2017 Boys State Champions)
- Soccer (boys' State Champions 1996, 2022 and 2023, girls State Champions 2016 and 2022)
- Swimming (2008, 2009, 2010, 2011 State Champions, girls')
- Roller hockey(club sport) (2002 State Champions, 2007 State Champions)
- Rugby union (club sport) (State Champions 2005, 2007, 2008 and 2011)
- Tennis (1996 girls' State Champions, 2005 boys' State Champions)
- Track & field (girls' 2010 State Champions)
- Volleyball
- Wrestling

== Notable alumni ==
- Mark Bloom - MLS soccer player
- A. J. Bowen - actor
- Kerry Brown - former Washington Redskins player
- Viet Cuong - composer
- Hanno Dirksen - South African rugby player
- Amy Dumas - professional wrestler and musician best known as Lita
- Bruce Elder - former all-SEC forward at Vanderbilt University
- Karen Fairchild - singer and co-founder of Little Big Town
- Kelly Flinn - first female B-52 pilot in the US Air Force
- Hal Hershfelt - National Women's Soccer League player for the Washington Spirit
- Bryan Lundquist - swimmer, world record holder in 4 × 100 m freestyle
- Philip Lutzenkirchen - former college football player for Auburn University and NFL player for the St. Louis Rams
- Hutson Mason - former college football player for the University of Georgia
- Melanie Moore - professional dancer
- Kyle Patrick - lead singer of The Click Five
- April Richardson - comedian, regular on Chelsea Lately; frequent contestant on @midnight
- Stefani Robinson - television writer, most notably for Atlanta; Emmy nominee
- Cody Rhodes - professional wrestler, co-founder of AEW
- Stephen Sklenka - United States Marine Corps Lieutenant General and current Deputy Commander, United States Indo-Pacific Command
- Lawson Vaughn - MLS professional soccer player
