= Kerry Brown (American football) =

American football player (born 1985)

No. 76
- Position: Guard

Personal information
- Born: June 19, 1985 (age 41); Marietta, Georgia, U.S.
- Listed height: 6 ft 6 in (1.98 m)
- Listed weight: 305 lb (138 kg)

Career information
- College: Appalachian State (2004–2007)
- NFL draft: 2008: undrafted

Career history
- Washington Redskins (2008)

Awards and highlights
- 3× NCAA Division I-AA/FCS national champion (2005–2007); 2× Southern Conference Jacobs Blocking Trophy (2006, 2007); Appalachian State Athletic Hall of Fame (2016)

Kerry Brown (born June 19, 1985) is an American former football offensive lineman and left guard. He played for the Washington Redskins of the National Football League (NFL). He was signed by the Redskins as an undrafted free agent in 2008. He played college football at Appalachian State and was inducted into the Appalachian State University Hall of Fame in 2016.

== Early life ==
Brown attended and played high school football at Lassiter High School in Marietta, Georgia.

== College career ==
Brown played college football at Appalachian State University, and was redshirted his first year. After making appearances in eight games during his second year, Brown was named first-team all-Southern Conference by the coaches and second-team by the league’s media. He led the Mountaineers with 84 knockdowns and ranked second with five pins despite sharing time at right guard with Kyle Knox. In 2006, Brown became Appalachian’s second-straight Jacobs Blocking Trophy recipient. Brown led the team with 106 knockdowns. Brown started 31 consecutive games at left guard. His accomplishments on the field earned him nomination and an award to the Appalachian State University Hall of Fame class of 2016 along with former teammate Julian Rauch.
