= List of NFL career receiving yards leaders =

Jerry Rice is the NFL's all-time leader in receiving yards, with 22,895. He is the only player to surpass 18,000 yards. Here are the players with at least 10,000 receiving yards:

== Regular season career receiving yards leaders ==
Key
| ^ | Inducted into the Pro Football Hall of Fame |
| * | Denotes active player |

Through Week 10 of 2026 season.

| Rank | Player | Position | Team(s) by season | Receptions | Yards | Average |
|---|---|---|---|---|---|---|
| 1 | Jerry Rice^{^} | Wide receiver | San Francisco 49ers (1985–2000); Oakland Raiders (2001–2004); Seattle Seahawks (2004) | 1,549 | 22,895 | 14.8 |
| 2 | Larry Fitzgerald^{^} | Wide receiver | Arizona Cardinals (2004–2020) | 1,432 | 17,492 | 12.2 |
| 3 | Terrell Owens^{^} | Wide receiver | San Francisco 49ers (1996–2003); Philadelphia Eagles (2004–2005); Dallas Cowboys (2006–2008); Buffalo Bills (2009); Cincinnati Bengals (2010) | 1,078 | 15,934 | 14.8 |
| 4 | Randy Moss^{^} | Wide receiver | Minnesota Vikings (1998–2004, 2010); Oakland Raiders (2005–2006); New England Patriots (2007–2010); Tennessee Titans (2010); San Francisco 49ers (2012) | 982 | 15,292 | 15.6 |
| 5 | Isaac Bruce^{^} | Wide receiver | Los Angeles / St. Louis Rams (1994–2007); San Francisco 49ers (2008–2009) | 1,024 | 15,208 | 14.9 |
| 6 | Tony Gonzalez^{^} | Tight end | Kansas City Chiefs (1997–2008); Atlanta Falcons (2009–2013) | 1,325 | 15,127 | 11.4 |
| 7 | Tim Brown^{^} | Wide receiver | L.A./Oakland Raiders (1988–2003); Tampa Bay Buccaneers (2004) | 1,094 | 14,934 | 13.7 |
| 8 | Steve Smith Sr. | Wide receiver | Carolina Panthers (2001–2013); Baltimore Ravens (2014–2016) | 1,031 | 14,731 | 14.3 |
| 9 | Marvin Harrison^{^} | Wide receiver | Indianapolis Colts (1996–2008) | 1,102 | 14,580 | 13.2 |
| 10 | Reggie Wayne | Wide receiver | Indianapolis Colts (2001–2014) | 1,070 | 14,345 | 13.5 |
| 11 | Andre Johnson^{^} | Wide receiver | Houston Texans (2003–2014); Indianapolis Colts (2015); Tennessee Titans (2016) | 1,062 | 14,185 | 13.4 |
| 12 | James Lofton^{^} | Wide receiver | Green Bay Packers (1978–1986); Los Angeles Raiders (1987–1988); Buffalo Bills (1989–1992); Los Angeles Rams (1993); Philadelphia Eagles (1993) | 764 | 14,004 | 18.3 |
| 13 | Cris Carter^{^} | Wide receiver | Philadelphia Eagles (1987–1989); Minnesota Vikings (1990–2001); Miami Dolphins (2002) | 1,101 | 13,899 | 12.6 |
| 14 | Anquan Boldin | Wide receiver | Arizona Cardinals (2003–2009); Baltimore Ravens (2010–2012); San Francisco 49ers (2013–2015); Detroit Lions (2016) | 1,076 | 13,779 | 12.8 |
| 15 | Henry Ellard | Wide receiver | Los Angeles Rams (1983–1993); Washington Redskins (1994–1998); New England Patriots (1998) | 814 | 13,777 | 16.9 |
| 16 | Julio Jones | Wide receiver | Atlanta Falcons (2011–2020); Tennessee Titans (2021); Tampa Bay Buccaneers (2022); Philadelphia Eagles (2023) | 914 | 13,703 | 15.0 |
| 17 | Travis Kelce^{*} | Tight end | Kansas City Chiefs (2013–present) | 1,115 | 13,514 | 12.1 |
| 18 | Mike Evans^{*} | Wide receiver | Tampa Bay Buccaneers (2014–2025); San Francisco 49ers (2026–present) | 893 | 13,472 | 15.1 |
| 18 | Torry Holt | Wide receiver | St. Louis Rams (1999–2008); Jacksonville Jaguars (2009) | 920 | 13,382 | 14.5 |
| 20 | DeAndre Hopkins | Wide receiver | Houston Texans (2013–2019); Arizona Cardinals (2020–2022); Tennessee Titans (2023–2024); Kansas City Chiefs (2024); Baltimore Ravens (2025) | 1,006 | 13,295 | 13.2 |
| 21 | Andre Reed^{^} | Wide receiver | Buffalo Bills (1985–1999); Washington Redskins (2000) | 951 | 13,198 | 13.9 |
| 22 | Davante Adams^{*} | Wide receiver | Green Bay Packers (2014–2021); Las Vegas Raiders (2022–2024); New York Jets (2024); Los Angeles Rams (2025–present) | 1,047 | 13,113 | 12.5 |
| 23 | Steve Largent^{^} | Wide receiver | Seattle Seahawks (1976–1989) | 819 | 13,089 | 16.0 |
| 24 | Jason Witten | Tight end | Dallas Cowboys (2003–2017, 2019); Las Vegas Raiders (2020) | 1,228 | 13,046 | 10.6 |
| 25 | Irving Fryar | Wide receiver | New England Patriots (1984–1992); Miami Dolphins (1993–1995); Philadelphia Eagles (1996–1998); Washington Redskins (1999–2000) | 851 | 12,785 | 15.0 |
| 26 | Art Monk^{^} | Wide receiver | Washington Redskins (1980–1993); New York Jets (1994); Philadelphia Eagles (1995) | 940 | 12,721 | 13.5 |
| 27 | Keenan Allen^{*} | Wide receiver | San Diego/L.A. Chargers (2013– 2023, 2025); Chicago Bears (2024); Indianapolis Colts (2026–present) | 1,100 | 12,463 | 11.3 |
| 28 | Brandon Marshall | Wide receiver | Denver Broncos (2006–2009); Miami Dolphins (2010–2011); Chicago Bears (2012–2014); New York Jets (2015–2016); New York Giants (2017); Seattle Seahawks/New Orleans Saints (2018) | 970 | 12,351 | 12.7 |
| 29 | Antonio Brown | Wide receiver | Pittsburgh Steelers (2010–2018); New England Patriots (2019); Tampa Bay Buccaneers (2020–2021) | 928 | 12,291 | 13.2 |
| 30 | Jimmy Smith | Wide receiver | Dallas Cowboys (1992–1993); Jacksonville Jaguars (1995–2005) | 862 | 12,287 | 14.3 |
| 31 | Charlie Joiner^{^} | Wide receiver | Houston Oilers (1969–1972); Cincinnati Bengals (1972–1975); San Diego Chargers (1976–1986) | 750 | 12,146 | 16.2 |
| 32 | Hines Ward | Wide receiver | Pittsburgh Steelers (1998–2011) | 1,000 | 12,083 | 12.1 |
| 33 | Derrick Mason | Wide receiver | Tennessee Oilers/Titans (1997–2004); Baltimore Ravens (2005–2010); New York Jets/Houston Texans (2011) | 943 | 12,061 | 12.8 |
| 34 | Michael Irvin^{^} | Wide receiver | Dallas Cowboys (1988–1999) | 750 | 11,904 | 15.9 |
| 35 | Stefon Diggs^{*} | Wide receiver | Minnesota Vikings (2015–2019); Buffalo Bills (2020–2023); Houston Texans (2024); New England Patriots (2025); Washington Commanders (2026–present) | 978 | 11,890 | 12.2 |
| 36 | Antonio Gates^{^} | Tight end | San Diego/L.A. Chargers (2003–2018) | 955 | 11,841 | 12.4 |
| 37 | Don Maynard^{^} | Wide receiver | New York Giants (1958); New York Titans/Jets (1960–1972); St. Louis Cardinals (1973) | 633 | 11,834 | 18.7 |
| 38 | Calvin Johnson^{^} | Wide receiver | Detroit Lions (2007–2015) | 731 | 11,619 | 15.9 |
| 39 | Muhsin Muhammad | Wide receiver | Carolina Panthers (1996–2004, 2008–2009); Chicago Bears (2005–2007) | 860 | 11,438 | 13.3 |
| 40 | Rod Smith | Wide receiver | Denver Broncos (1995–2007) | 849 | 11,389 | 13.4 |
| 41 | Keenan McCardell | Wide receiver | Cleveland Browns (1992–1995); Jacksonville Jaguars (1996–2001); Tampa Bay Buccaneers (2002–2003); San Diego Chargers (2004–2006); Washington Redskins (2007) | 883 | 11,373 | 12.9 |
| 42 | Tyreek Hill | Wide receiver | Kansas City Chiefs (2016–2021); Miami Dolphins (2022–2025) | 819 | 11,363 | 13.9 |
| 43 | DeSean Jackson | Wide receiver | Philadelphia Eagles (2008–2013, 2019–2020); Washington Redskins (2014–2016); Tampa Bay Buccaneers (2017–2018); Los Angeles Rams (2021); Las Vegas Raiders (2021); Baltimore Ravens (2022) | 641 | 11,263 | 17.6 |
| 44 | Chad Johnson | Wide receiver | Cincinnati Bengals (2001–2010); New England Patriots (2011) | 766 | 11,059 | 14.4 |
| 45 | Joey Galloway | Wide receiver | Seattle Seahawks (1995–1999); Dallas Cowboys (2000–2003); Tampa Bay Buccaneers (2004–2008); New England Patriots/Pittsburgh Steelers (2009); Washington Redskins (2010) | 701 | 10,950 | 12.6 |
| 46 | Roddy White | Wide receiver | Atlanta Falcons (2005–2015) | 808 | 10,863 | 13.4 |
| 47 | Gary Clark | Wide receiver | Washington Redskins (1985–1992); Arizona/Phoenix Cardinals (1993–1994); Miami Dolphins (1995) | 699 | 10,856 | 15.5 |
| 48 | Stanley Morgan | Wide receiver | New England Patriots (1977–1989); Indianapolis Colts (1990) | 557 | 10,716 | 19.2 |
| 49 | Keyshawn Johnson | Wide receiver | New York Jets (1996–1999); Tampa Bay Buccaneers (2000–2003); Dallas Cowboys (2004–2005); Carolina Panthers (2006) | 814 | 10,571 | 13.0 |
| 50 | A. J. Green | Wide receiver | Cincinnati Bengals (2011–2020); Arizona Cardinals (2021–2022) | 727 | 10,514 | 14.5 |
| 51 | Harold Jackson | Wide receiver | Los Angeles Rams (1968), 1973–1977); Philadelphia Eagles (1969–1972); New England Patriots (1978–1982); Minnesota Vikings (1982); Seattle Seahawks (1983) | 579 | 10,372 | 17.9 |
| 52 | Santana Moss | Wide receiver | New York Jets (2001–2004); Washington Redskins (2005–2014) | 733 | 10,283 | 14.0 |
| 53 | Lance Alworth^{^} | Wide receiver | San Diego Chargers (1962–1970); Dallas Cowboys (1971–1972) | 542 | 10,266 | 18.9 |
| 54 | Andre Rison | Wide receiver | Indianapolis Colts (1989); Atlanta Falcons (1990–1994); Cleveland Browns (1995); Jacksonville Jaguars (1996); Green Bay Packers (1996); Kansas City Chiefs (1997–1999); Oakland Raiders (2000) | 743 | 10,205 | 13.7 |
| 55 | Donald Driver | Wide receiver | Green Bay Packers (1999–2012) | 743 | 10,137 | 13.6 |
| 56 | Shannon Sharpe^{^} | Tight end | Denver Broncos (1990–1999), (2002–2003); Baltimore Ravens (2000–2001) | 815 | 10,060 | 12.3 |
| 57 | Amari Cooper | Wide Receiver | Oakland Raiders (2015–2018); Dallas Cowboys (2018–2021); Cleveland Browns (2022–2024); Buffalo Bills (2024) | 711 | 10,033 | 14.1 |

== Players with at least 1,000 postseason receiving yards ==
Through the 2025 playoffs.

| Rank | Player | Position | Team(s) by season | Receptions | Yards | Average |
|---|---|---|---|---|---|---|
| 1 | Jerry Rice^{^} | Wide receiver | San Francisco 49ers (1985–2000); Oakland Raiders (2001–2004); Seattle Seahawks (2004) | 151 | 2,245 | 14.9 |
| 2 | Travis Kelce^{*} | Tight end | Kansas City Chiefs (2013–present) | 178 | 2,078 | 11.7 |
| 3 | Julian Edelman | Wide receiver | New England Patriots (2009–2020) | 118 | 1,442 | 12.2 |
| 4 | Rob Gronkowski | Tight end | New England Patriots (2010–2018); Tampa Bay Buccaneers (2020–2021) | 98 | 1,389 | 14.2 |
| 5 | Michael Irvin^{^} | Wide receiver | Dallas Cowboys (1988–1999) | 87 | 1,315 | 15.1 |
| 6 | Cliff Branch^{^} | Wide receiver | Oakland Raiders (1972–1985) | 73 | 1,289 | 17.7 |
| 7 | Reggie Wayne | Wide receiver | Indianapolis Colts (2001–2014) | 93 | 1,254 | 13.5 |
| 8 | Andre Reed^{^} | Wide receiver | Buffalo Bills (1985–1999); Washington Redskins (2000) | 85 | 1,229 | 14.5 |
| 9 | Tyreek Hill | Wide receiver | Kansas City Chiefs (2016–2021); Miami Dolphins (2022–2025) | 96 | 1,212 | 12.6 |
| 10 | Hines Ward | Wide receiver | Pittsburgh Steelers (1998–2011) | 88 | 1,181 | 13.4 |
| 11 | Fred Biletnikoff^{^} | Wide receiver | Oakland Raiders (1965–1978) | 70 | 1,167 | 16.7 |
| 12 | Drew Pearson^{^} | Wide receiver | Dallas Cowboys (1973–1983) | 68 | 1,131 | 16.6 |
| 13 | Paul Warfield^{^} | Wide receiver | Cleveland Browns (1964–1969, 1976–1977); Miami Dolphins (1970–1974) | 58 | 1,121 | 19.3 |
| 14 | Davante Adams^{*} | Wide receiver | Green Bay Packers (2014–2021); Las Vegas Raiders (2022–2024); New York Jets (2024); Los Angeles Rams (2025–present) | 83 | 1,095 | 13.2 |
| 15 | Art Monk^{^} | Wide receiver | Washington Redskins (1980–1993); New York Jets (1994); Philadelphia Eagles (1995) | 69 | 1,062 | 15.4 |
| 16 | Anquan Boldin | Wide receiver | Arizona Cardinals (2003–2009); Baltimore Ravens (2010–2012); San Francisco 49ers (2013–2015); Detroit Lions (2016) | 70 | 1,057 | 15.1 |
| 17 | John Stallworth^{^} | Wide receiver | Pittsburgh Steelers (1974–1987) | 57 | 1,054 | 17.5 |
| 18 | Stefon Diggs^{*} | Wide receiver | Minnesota Vikings (2015–2019); Buffalo Bills (2020–2023); Houston Texans (2024); New England Patriots (2025); Washington Commanders (2026–present) | 83 | 1,019 | 12.3 |
| 19 | Steve Smith Sr. | Wide receiver | Carolina Panthers (2001–2013); Baltimore Ravens (2014–2016) | 59 | 1,001 | 17.0 |

== See also ==
- NFL records (individual)
- List of National Football League career receiving touchdowns leaders
- List of National Football League career receptions leaders
- List of National Football League annual receiving yards leaders
