= Willie Martinez (American football) =

American football player and coach (born 1963)

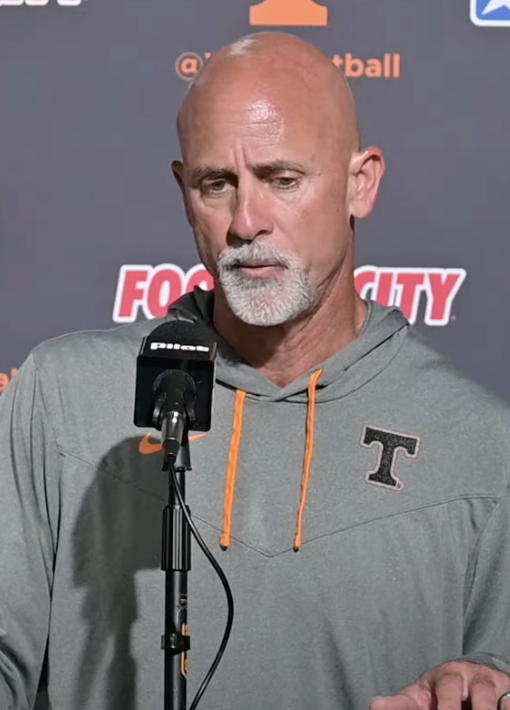
- Martinez in 2024

Current position
- Title: Cornerbacks coach
- Conference: SEC

Biographical details
- Born: February 21, 1963 (age 63)
- Education: Miami (FL)

Playing career
- Position: Defensive back

Coaching career (HC unless noted)
- 1985–1986: Miami (FL) (GA)
- 1988: Bethune-Cookman (WR)
- 1989–1990: Boca Raton HS (FL) (secondary)
- 1991: Olympic Heights HS (FL) (DC/secondary)
- 1992–1993: Grand Valley State (DC/secondary)
- 1994: Central Michigan (secondary)
- 1995–1996: UCF (DC/secondary)
- 1997: Eastern Michigan (secondary)
- 1998–1999: Central Michigan (secondary)
- 2000: Central Michigan (AHC/secondary)
- 2001–2004: Georgia (secondary)
- 2005–2009: Georgia (DC/secondary)
- 2010–2011: Oklahoma (secondary)
- 2012: Auburn (secondary)
- 2013–2016: Tennessee (AHC/secondary)
- 2017: Cincinnati (secondary)
- 2018–2020: UCF (AHC/secondary)
- 2021–2026: Tennessee (Cornerbacks)

Accomplishments and honors

Championships
- National (1983)

Willie Martinez (born February 21, 1963) is an American football coach who was most recently the cornerbacks coach for the University of Tennessee. Prior, he served as the assistant head coach and secondary coach for the University of Central Florida (UCF).

== Playing career ==
Martinez played defensive back at the University of Miami from 1981–1984. He was part of the 1983 team that won the National Championship.

== Coaching career ==
Martinez served as the defensive backs coach for the Oklahoma Sooners football team from 2010 to January 2012, when he resigned. On February 13, 2012, Martinez was hired to coach defensive backs for Auburn University. The move reunited him with Auburn's Defensive Coordinator Brian VanGorder. The two had coached together for several years at Central Florida, Central Michigan, and the University of Georgia. In December 2012, Martinez joined Butch Jones's staff at Tennessee until January 2017, then in 2020 when Tennessee fired their head coach Jeremy Pruitt, Tennessee hired Josh Heupel and Heupel then hired Martinez to his staff.
