= List of NFL career receiving touchdowns leaders =

This is a list of the 41 NFL players with at least 75 receiving touchdowns. Jerry Rice leads with 197, and also leads in postseason touchdowns with 22.

Players listed in bold are active NFL players.

== Players with at least 75 touchdowns ==
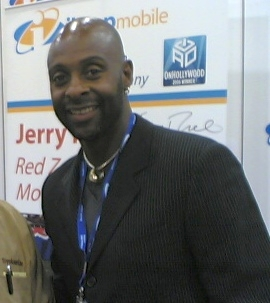
Jerry Rice has the most career receiving touchdowns with 197.

Key
^	Inducted into the Pro Football Hall of Fame
*	Denotes player who is still active

Through Week 10 of 2026 season.

Rank	Player	Team(s) by season	Touchdowns
1	Jerry Rice^{^}	San Francisco 49ers (1985–2000); Oakland Raiders (2001–2004); Seattle Seahawks (2004)	197
2	Randy Moss^{^}	Minnesota Vikings (1998–2004, 2010); Oakland Raiders (2005–2006); New England Patriots (2007–2010); Tennessee Titans (2010); San Francisco 49ers (2012)	156
3	Terrell Owens^{^}	San Francisco 49ers (1996–2003); Philadelphia Eagles (2004–2005); Dallas Cowboys (2006–2008); Buffalo Bills (2009); Cincinnati Bengals (2010)	153
4	Cris Carter^{^}	Philadelphia Eagles (1987–1989); Minnesota Vikings (1990–2001); Miami Dolphins (2002)	130
5	Marvin Harrison^{^}	Indianapolis Colts (1996–2008)	128
6	Larry Fitzgerald^{^}	Arizona Cardinals (2004–2020)	121
7	Davante Adams^{*}	Green Bay Packers (2014–2021); Las Vegas Raiders (2022–2024); New York Jets (2024); Los Angeles Rams (2025–present)	121
8	Antonio Gates^{^}	San Diego/Los Angeles Chargers (2003–2018)	116
9	Tony Gonzalez^{^}	Kansas City Chiefs (1997–2008); Atlanta Falcons (2009–2013)	111
10	Mike Evans^{*}	Tampa Bay Buccaneers (2014–2025); San Francisco 49ers (2026–present)	111
11	Tim Brown^{^}	Los Angeles/Oakland Raiders (1988–2003); Tampa Bay Buccaneers (2004)	100
11	Steve Largent^{^}	Seattle Seahawks (1976–1989)	100
13	Don Hutson^{^}	Green Bay Packers (1935–1945)	99
14	Rob Gronkowski	New England Patriots (2010–2018); Tampa Bay Buccaneers (2020–2021)	92
15	Isaac Bruce^{^}	Los Angeles/St. Louis Rams (1994–2007); San Francisco 49ers (2008–2009)	91
16	Jimmy Graham	New Orleans Saints (2010–2014, 2023); Seattle Seahawks (2015–2017); Green Bay Packers (2018–2019); Chicago Bears (2020–2021)	89
17	Don Maynard^{^}	New York Giants (1958); New York Jets (1960–1972); St. Louis Cardinals (1973)	88
18	Andre Reed^{^}	Buffalo Bills (1985–1999); Washington Redskins (2000)	87
19	Lance Alworth^{^}	San Diego Chargers (1962–1970); Dallas Cowboys (1971–1972)	85
19	DeAndre Hopkins	Houston Texans (2013–2019); Arizona Cardinals (2020–2022); Tennessee Titans (2023–2024); Kansas City Chiefs (2024); Baltimore Ravens (2025)	85
19	Hines Ward	Pittsburgh Steelers (1998–2011)	85
19	Paul Warfield^{^}	Cleveland Browns (1964–1969, 1976–1977); Miami Dolphins (1970–1974)	85
23	Mark Clayton	Miami Dolphins (1983–1992); Green Bay Packers (1993)	84
23	Irving Fryar	New England Patriots (1984–1992); Miami Dolphins (1993–1995); Philadelphia Eagles (1996–1998); Washington Redskins (1999–2000)	84
23	Tommy McDonald^{^}	Philadelphia Eagles (1957–1963); Dallas Cowboys (1964); Los Angeles Rams (1965–1966); Atlanta Falcons (1967); Cleveland Browns (1968)	84
23	Andre Rison	Indianapolis Colts (1989); Atlanta Falcons (1990–1994); Cleveland Browns (1995); Jacksonville Jaguars (1996); Green Bay Packers (1996); Kansas City Chiefs (1997–1999); Oakland Raiders (2000)	84
23	Travis Kelce^{*}	Kansas City Chiefs (2013–present)	84
28	Antonio Brown	Pittsburgh Steelers (2010–2018); New England Patriots (2019); Tampa Bay Buccaneers (2020–2021)	83
28	Tyreek Hill	Kansas City Chiefs (2016–2021); Miami Dolphins (2022–2025)	83
28	Calvin Johnson^{^}	Detroit Lions (2007–2015)	83
28	Brandon Marshall	Denver Broncos (2006–2009); Miami Dolphins (2010–2011); Chicago Bears (2012–2014); New York Jets (2015–2016); New York Giants (2017); Seattle Seahawks (2018); New Orleans Saints (2018)	83
32	Anquan Boldin	Arizona Cardinals (2003–2009); Baltimore Ravens (2010–2012); San Francisco 49ers (2013–2015); Detroit Lions (2016)	82
32	Reggie Wayne	Indianapolis Colts (2001–2014)	82
34	Art Powell	Philadelphia Eagles (1959); New York Titans (1960–1962); Oakland Raiders (1963–1966); Buffalo Bills (1967); Minnesota Vikings (1968)	81
34	Steve Smith Sr.	Carolina Panthers (2001–2013); Baltimore Ravens (2014–2016)	81
36	Stefon Diggs^{*}	Minnesota Vikings (2015–2019); Buffalo Bills (2020–2023); Houston Texans (2024); New England Patriots (2025); Washington Commanders (2026–present)	80
37	Harold Carmichael^{^}	Philadelphia Eagles (1971–1983); Dallas Cowboys (1984)	79
37	Charley Taylor^{^}	Washington Redskins (1964–1975, 1977)	79
39	Joey Galloway	Seattle Seahawks (1995–1999); Dallas Cowboys (2000–2003); Tampa Bay Buccaneers (2004–2008); New England Patriots (2009); Pittsburgh Steelers (2009); Washington Redskins (2010)	77
40	Fred Biletnikoff^{^}	Oakland Raiders (1965–1978)	76
40	Harold Jackson	Los Angeles Rams (1968, 1973–1977); Philadelphia Eagles (1969–1972); New England Patriots (1978–1981); Minnesota Vikings (1982); Seattle Seahawks (1983)	76
42	Dez Bryant	Dallas Cowboys (2010–2017); New Orleans Saints (2018); Baltimore Ravens (2020)	75
42	James Lofton^{^}	Green Bay Packers (1978–1986); Los Angeles Raiders (1987–1988); Buffalo Bills (1989–1992); Los Angeles Rams/Philadelphia Eagles (1993)	75

== Players with at least 10 postseason receiving touchdowns ==
Through 2025 playoffs.

Rank	Player	Team(s) by season	Touchdowns
1	Jerry Rice^{^}	San Francisco 49ers (1985–2000); Oakland Raiders (2001–2004); Seattle Seahawks (2004)	22
2	Travis Kelce^{*}	Kansas City Chiefs (2013–present)	20
3	Rob Gronkowski	New England Patriots (2010–2018); Tampa Bay Buccaneers (2020–2021)	15
4	John Stallworth^{^}	Pittsburgh Steelers (1974–1987)	12
5	Fred Biletnikoff^{^}	Oakland Raiders (1965–1978)	10
5	Larry Fitzgerald^{^}	Arizona Cardinals (2004–2020)	10
5	Antonio Freeman	Green Bay Packers (1995–2001, 2003); Philadelphia Eagles (2002)	10
5	Randy Moss^{^}	Minnesota Vikings (1998–2004, 2010); Oakland Raiders (2005–2006); New England Patriots (2007–2010); Tennessee Titans (2010); San Francisco 49ers (2012)	10
5	Hines Ward	Pittsburgh Steelers (1998–2011)	10

== Historical receiving touchdowns leaders ==
Eleven players are recognized as having held outright or tied the record as the NFL's career receiving touchdowns leader. The longest record holder was Don Hutson who held the record for 49 years.

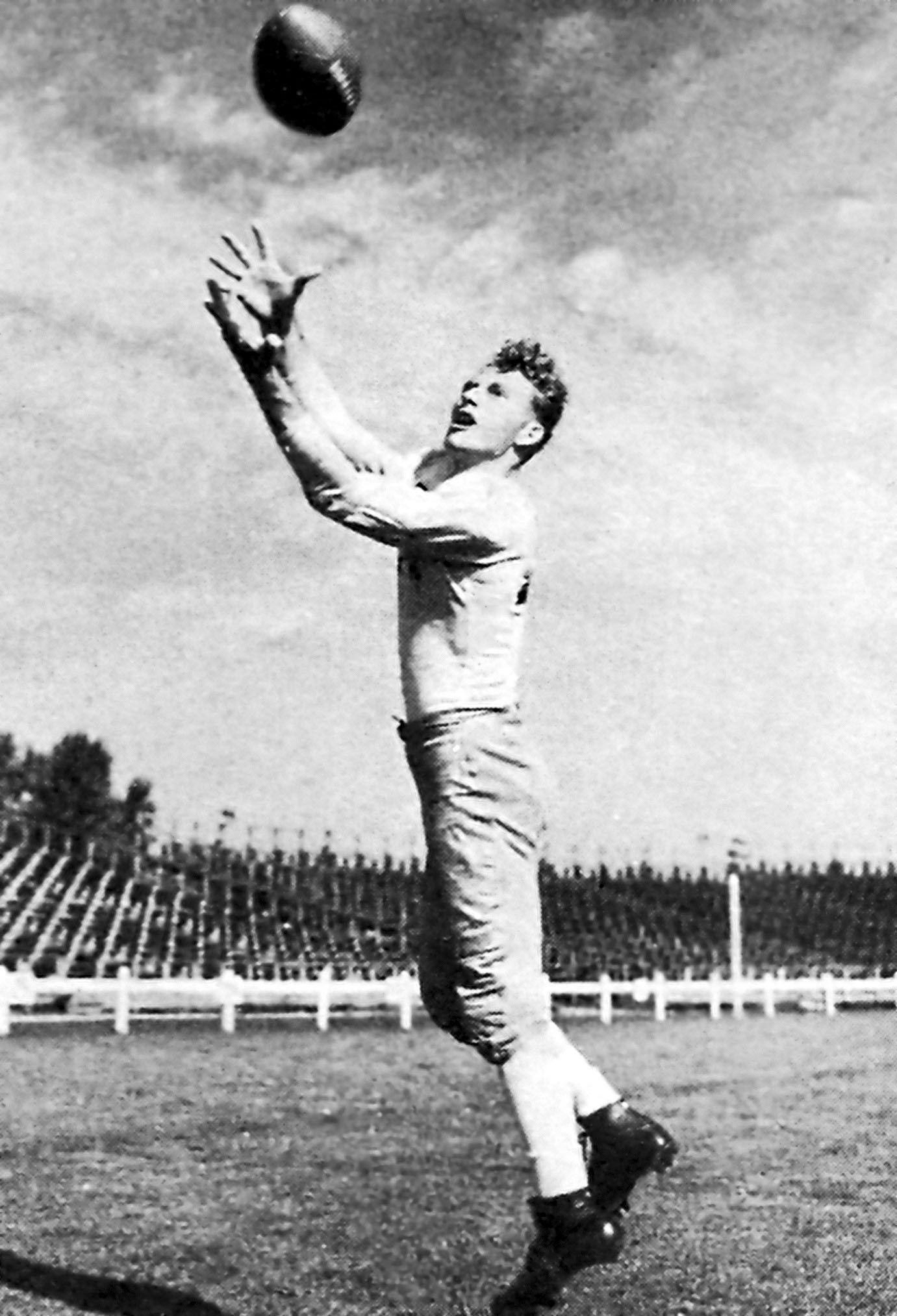
Don Hutson held the TD receiving record for 49 years.

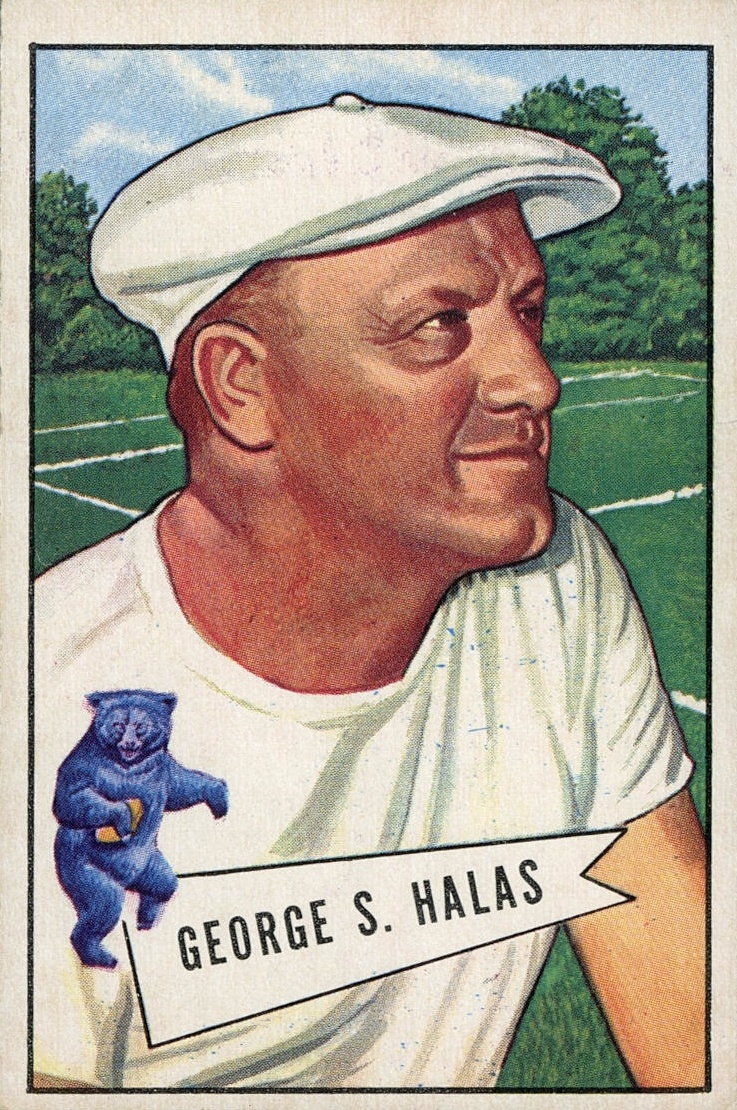
George Halas was the first receiving TD leader and held the record two years.

Reign	Player	Team(s) by season	Receiving touchdowns	Season(s)
1921	Heinie Miller and	Buffalo All-Americans (1920–1921)	3	1921
1921	George Halas^{^}	Chicago Staleys	3	1921
1922 (2 years)	George Halas^{^}	Chicago Bears	4	1922
1923	Scotty Bierce^{^} and Guy Chamberlin	Cleveland Indians; Canton Bulldogs	5	1923
1924–1927 (4 years)	Bob Rapp	Columbus Tigers	8	1924
1924–1927 (4 years)	Bob Rapp	Columbus Tigers	9	1925–1927
1928	Jimmy Conzelman^{^}	Providence Steam Roller	10	1928
1929–1930 (2 years)	Ray Flaherty^{^}	New York Yankees (1927–1928); New York Giants (1929, 1931–1935)	13	1929–1930
1931–1939 (9 years)	Johnny Blood^{^}	Green Bay Packers (1929–1933); Pittsburgh Pirates (1934); Green Bay Packers (1935–1936); Pittsburgh Pirates (1937–1938)	22	1931
1931–1939 (9 years)	Johnny Blood^{^}	Green Bay Packers (1929–1933); Pittsburgh Pirates (1934); Green Bay Packers (1935–1936); Pittsburgh Pirates (1937–1938)	25	1932
1931–1939 (9 years)	Johnny Blood^{^}	Green Bay Packers (1929–1933); Pittsburgh Pirates (1934); Green Bay Packers (1935–1936); Pittsburgh Pirates (1937–1938)	28	1933–1934
1931–1939 (9 years)	Johnny Blood^{^}	Green Bay Packers (1929–1933); Pittsburgh Pirates (1934); Green Bay Packers (1935–1936); Pittsburgh Pirates (1937–1938)	31	1935
1931–1939 (9 years)	Johnny Blood^{^}	Green Bay Packers (1929–1933); Pittsburgh Pirates (1934); Green Bay Packers (1935–1936); Pittsburgh Pirates (1937–1938)	33	1936
1931–1939 (9 years)	Johnny Blood^{^}	Green Bay Packers (1929–1933); Pittsburgh Pirates (1934); Green Bay Packers (1935–1936); Pittsburgh Pirates (1937–1938)	37	1937–1939
1940–1988 (49 years)	Don Hutson^{^}	Green Bay Packers (1935–1945)	43	1940
1940–1988 (49 years)	Don Hutson^{^}	Green Bay Packers (1935–1945)	53	1941
1940–1988 (49 years)	Don Hutson^{^}	Green Bay Packers (1935–1945)	70	1942
1940–1988 (49 years)	Don Hutson^{^}	Green Bay Packers (1935–1945)	81	1943
1940–1988 (49 years)	Don Hutson^{^}	Green Bay Packers (1935–1945)	90	1944
1940–1988 (49 years)	Don Hutson^{^}	Green Bay Packers (1935–1945)	99	1945–1988
1989–1991 (3 years)	Steve Largent^{^}	Seattle Seahawks (1976–1989)	100	1989–1991
Since 1992 (35 years)	Jerry Rice^{^}	San Francisco 49ers (1985–2000); Oakland Raiders (2001–2004); Seattle Seahawks (2004)	103	1992
Since 1992 (35 years)	Jerry Rice^{^}	San Francisco 49ers (1985–2000); Oakland Raiders (2001–2004); Seattle Seahawks (2004)	118	1993
Since 1992 (35 years)	Jerry Rice^{^}	San Francisco 49ers (1985–2000); Oakland Raiders (2001–2004); Seattle Seahawks (2004)	131	1994
Since 1992 (35 years)	Jerry Rice^{^}	San Francisco 49ers (1985–2000); Oakland Raiders (2001–2004); Seattle Seahawks (2004)	146	1995
Since 1992 (35 years)	Jerry Rice^{^}	San Francisco 49ers (1985–2000); Oakland Raiders (2001–2004); Seattle Seahawks (2004)	154	1996
Since 1992 (35 years)	Jerry Rice^{^}	San Francisco 49ers (1985–2000); Oakland Raiders (2001–2004); Seattle Seahawks (2004)	155	1997
Since 1992 (35 years)	Jerry Rice^{^}	San Francisco 49ers (1985–2000); Oakland Raiders (2001–2004); Seattle Seahawks (2004)	164	1998
Since 1992 (35 years)	Jerry Rice^{^}	San Francisco 49ers (1985–2000); Oakland Raiders (2001–2004); Seattle Seahawks (2004)	169	1999
Since 1992 (35 years)	Jerry Rice^{^}	San Francisco 49ers (1985–2000); Oakland Raiders (2001–2004); Seattle Seahawks (2004)	176	2000
Since 1992 (35 years)	Jerry Rice^{^}	San Francisco 49ers (1985–2000); Oakland Raiders (2001–2004); Seattle Seahawks (2004)	185	2001
Since 1992 (35 years)	Jerry Rice^{^}	San Francisco 49ers (1985–2000); Oakland Raiders (2001–2004); Seattle Seahawks (2004)	192	2002
Since 1992 (35 years)	Jerry Rice^{^}	San Francisco 49ers (1985–2000); Oakland Raiders (2001–2004); Seattle Seahawks (2004)	194	2003
Since 1992 (35 years)	Jerry Rice^{^}	San Francisco 49ers (1985–2000); Oakland Raiders (2001–2004); Seattle Seahawks (2004)	197	2004–present

== See also ==
- NFL records (individual)
- List of NFL career receiving yards leaders
- List of NFL career receptions leaders
- List of NFL annual receiving touchdowns leaders
