= List of NFL career receptions leaders =

The 1,000 Catch Club is a group of 18 National Football League players with at least 1,000 career receptions. The list consists of 15 wide receivers and 3 tight ends.

== Players with at least 1,000 receptions ==
Key
^	Inducted into the Pro Football Hall of Fame
*	Denotes player who is still active

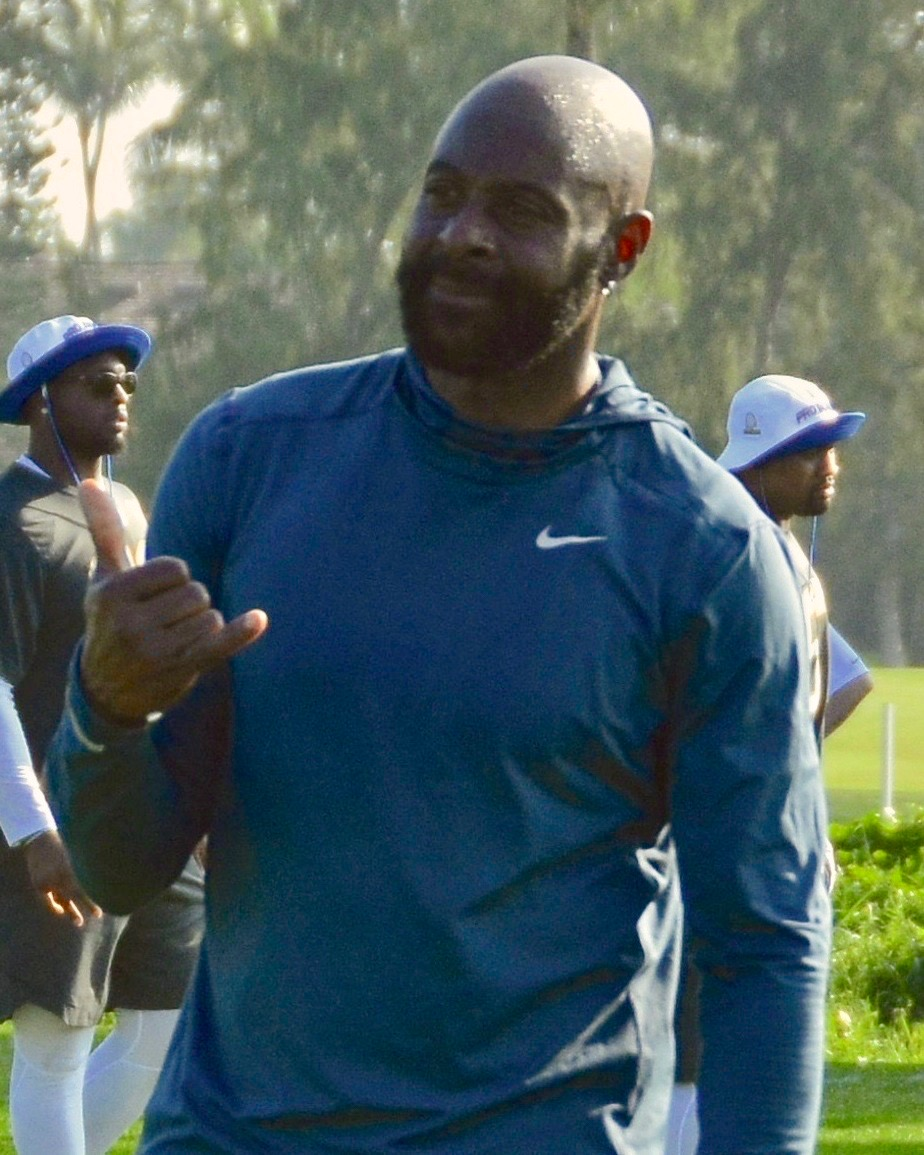
Jerry Rice is the all-time receptions leader.

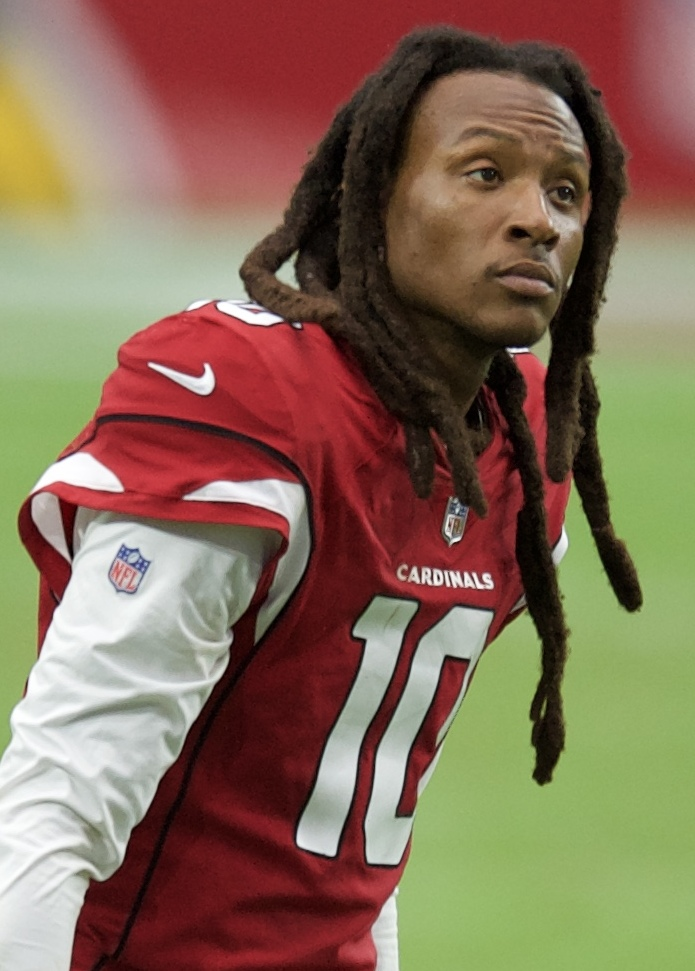
DeAndre Hopkins is the most recent player to reach the 1,000 reception milestone.

Through Week 10 of 2026 season

Rank	Player	Team(s)	Receptions
1	Jerry Rice^{^}	San Francisco 49ers (1985–2000); Oakland Raiders (2001–2004); Seattle Seahawks (2004)	1,549
2	Larry Fitzgerald^{^}	Arizona Cardinals (2004–2020)	1,432
3	Tony Gonzalez^{^}	Kansas City Chiefs (1997–2008); Atlanta Falcons (2009–2013)	1,325
4	Jason Witten	Dallas Cowboys (2003–2017, 2019); Las Vegas Raiders (2020)	1,228
5	Travis Kelce^{*}	Kansas City Chiefs (2013–present)	1,115
6	Marvin Harrison^{^}	Indianapolis Colts (1996–2008)	1,102
7	Cris Carter^{^}	Philadelphia Eagles (1987–1989); Minnesota Vikings (1990–2001); Miami Dolphins (2002)	1,101
8	Keenan Allen^{*}	San Diego/Los Angeles Chargers (2013–2023, 2025); Chicago Bears (2024); Indianapolis Colts (2026–present)	1,100
9	Tim Brown^{^}	Los Angeles/Oakland Raiders (1988–2003); Tampa Bay Buccaneers (2004)	1,094
10	Terrell Owens^{^}	San Francisco 49ers (1996–2003); Philadelphia Eagles (2004–2005); Dallas Cowboys (2006–2008); Buffalo Bills (2009); Cincinnati Bengals (2010)	1,078
11	Anquan Boldin	Arizona Cardinals (2003–2009); Baltimore Ravens (2010–2012); San Francisco 49ers (2013–2015); Detroit Lions (2016)	1,076
12	Reggie Wayne	Indianapolis Colts (2001–2014)	1,070
13	Andre Johnson^{^}	Houston Texans (2003–2014); Indianapolis Colts (2015); Tennessee Titans (2016)	1,062
14	Davante Adams^{*}	Green Bay Packers (2014–2021); Las Vegas Raiders (2022–2024); New York Jets (2024); Los Angeles Rams (2025–present)	1,047
15	Steve Smith Sr.	Carolina Panthers (2001–2013); Baltimore Ravens (2014–2016)	1,031
16	Isaac Bruce^{^}	Los Angeles/St. Louis Rams (1994–2007); San Francisco 49ers (2008–2009)	1,024
17	DeAndre Hopkins	Houston Texans (2013–2019); Arizona Cardinals (2020–2022); Tennessee Titans (2023–2024); Kansas City Chiefs (2024); Baltimore Ravens (2025)	1,006
18	Hines Ward	Pittsburgh Steelers (1998–2011)	1,000

== Players with at least 900 receptions ==
Key
^	Inducted into the Pro Football Hall of Fame
*	Denotes player who is still active

Through Week 10 of 2026 season; includes ranking.

Rank	Player	Team(s)	Receptions
19	Randy Moss^{^}	Minnesota Vikings (1998–2004, 2010); Oakland Raiders (2005–2006); New England Patriots (2007–2010); Tennessee Titans (2010); San Francisco 49ers (2012)	982
20	Stefon Diggs^{*}	Minnesota Vikings (2015–2019); Buffalo Bills (2020–2023); Houston Texans (2024); New England Patriots (2025); Washington Commanders (2026–present)	978
21	Brandon Marshall	Denver Broncos (2006–2009); Miami Dolphins (2010–2011); Chicago Bears (2012–2014); New York Jets (2015–2016); New York Giants (2017); Seattle Seahawks/New Orleans Saints (2018)	970
22	Antonio Gates^{^}	San Diego/L.A. Chargers (2003–2018)	955
23	Andre Reed^{^}	Buffalo Bills (1985–1999); Washington Redskins (2000)	951
24	Derrick Mason	Tennessee Oilers/Titans (1997–2004); Baltimore Ravens (2005–2010); New York Jets/Houston Texans (2011)	943
25	Art Monk^{^}	Washington Redskins (1980–1993); New York Jets (1994); Philadelphia Eagles (1995)	940
26	Antonio Brown	Pittsburgh Steelers (2010–2018); New England Patriots (2019); Tampa Bay Buccaneers (2020–2021)	928
27	Torry Holt	St. Louis Rams (1999–2008); Jacksonville Jaguars (2009)	920
28	Julio Jones	Atlanta Falcons (2011–2020); Tennessee Titans (2021); Tampa Bay Buccaneers (2022); Philadelphia Eagles (2023)	914
29	Wes Welker	San Diego Chargers (2004); Miami Dolphins (2004–2006); New England Patriots (2007–2012); Denver Broncos (2013–2014); St. Louis Rams (2015)	903

== Players with at least 80 postseason receptions ==
Key
^	Inducted into the Pro Football Hall of Fame
*	Denotes player who is still active

Through the 2025 playoffs.

Rank	Player	Team(s) by season	Receptions
1	Travis Kelce^{*}	Kansas City Chiefs (2013–present)	178
2	Jerry Rice^{^}	San Francisco 49ers (1985–2000); Oakland Raiders (2001–2004); Seattle Seahawks (2004)	151
3	Julian Edelman	New England Patriots (2009–2020)	118
4	Rob Gronkowski	New England Patriots (2010–2018); Tampa Bay Buccaneers (2020–2021)	98
5	Tyreek Hill	Kansas City Chiefs (2016–2021); Miami Dolphins (2022–2025)	96
6	Reggie Wayne	Indianapolis Colts (2001–2014)	93
7	Hines Ward	Pittsburgh Steelers (1998–2011)	88
7	Wes Welker	San Diego Chargers (2004); Miami Dolphins (2004–2006); New England Patriots (2007–2012); Denver Broncos (2013–2014); St. Louis Rams (2015)	88
9	Michael Irvin^{^}	Dallas Cowboys (1988–1999)	87
10	Andre Reed^{^}	Buffalo Bills (1985–2000)	85
11	Davante Adams^{*}	Green Bay Packers (2014–2021); Las Vegas Raiders (2022–2024); New York Jets (2024); Los Angeles Rams (2025–present)	83
12	Stefon Diggs^{*}	Minnesota Vikings (2015–2019); Buffalo Bills (2020–2023); Houston Texans (2024); New England Patriots (2025)	83

== See also ==
- NFL records (individual)
- List of National Football League career receiving yards leaders
- List of National Football League career receiving touchdowns leaders
- List of National Football League annual receptions leaders
