= Amari Cooper =

American football player (born 1994)

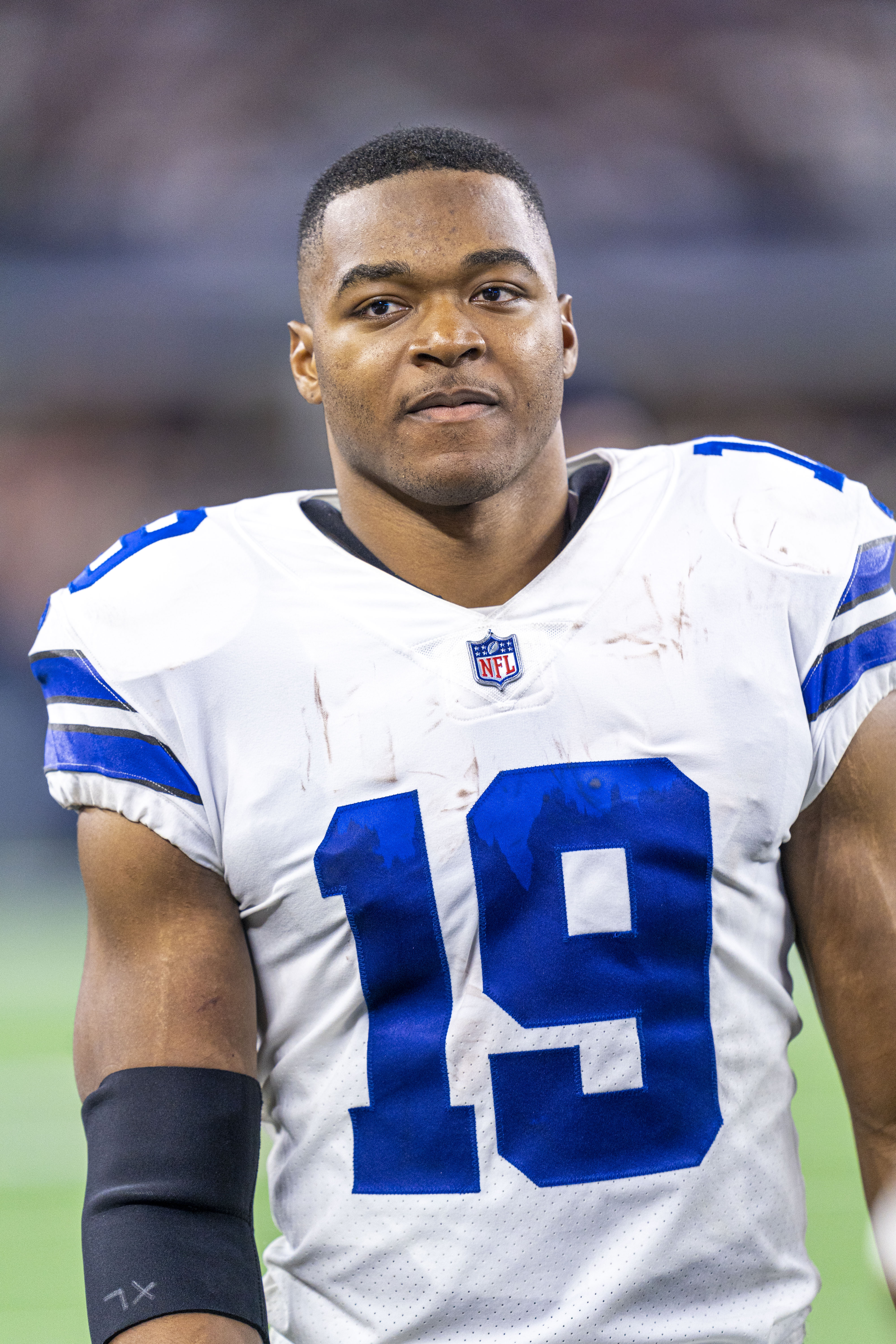
- Cooper with the Dallas Cowboys in 2021

No. 89, 19, 2, 18
- Position: Wide receiver

Personal information
- Born: June 17, 1994 (age 32); Miami, Florida, U.S.
- Listed height: 6 ft 1 in (1.85 m)
- Listed weight: 210 lb (95 kg)

Career information
- High school: Miami Northwestern
- College: Alabama (2012–2014)
- NFL draft: 2015: 1st round, 4th overall pick

Career history
- Oakland Raiders (2015–2018); Dallas Cowboys (2018–2021); Cleveland Browns (2022–2024); Buffalo Bills (2024); Las Vegas Raiders (2025)*
- * Offseason or practice squad member only

Awards and highlights
- 5× Pro Bowl (2015, 2016, 2018, 2019, 2023); PFWA All-Rookie Team (2015); BCS national champion (2012); Fred Biletnikoff Award (2014); Paul Warfield Trophy (2014); Unanimous All-American (2014); NCAA receptions leader (2014); SEC Offensive Player of the Year (2014); First-team All-SEC (2014)

Career NFL statistics
- Receptions: 711
- Receiving yards: 10,033
- Receiving touchdowns: 64
- Stats at Pro Football Reference

Amari Cooper (born June 17, 1994) is an American former professional football wide receiver who played 10 seasons in the National Football League (NFL). He played college football for the Alabama Crimson Tide, winning the Biletnikoff Award as the nation's top receiver and earning unanimous All-American honors in 2014. Cooper was selected by the Oakland Raiders in the first round (fourth overall) of the 2015 NFL draft.

After successful rookie and sophomore seasons that included back-to-back 1,000-yard campaigns and two Pro Bowl appearances, Cooper struggled in his third season with the Raiders, totaling just 680 yards. Midway through the 2018 season, Cooper was traded to the Dallas Cowboys and his play began to flourish again, including a 217-yard performance, and as a result, he was voted to the third Pro Bowl of his career. Cooper also had successive 1,000-yard seasons in 2019 and 2020, making the Pro Bowl in 2019. In 2022, he was traded to the Cleveland Browns. Cooper had 1,000-yard seasons in 2022 and 2023, becoming the first Browns wide receiver in team history with multiple 1,000-yard seasons. He was traded to the Buffalo Bills midway through the 2024 season, spending one season with the team before retiring in 2025.

== Early life ==
Cooper was born on June 17, 1994, in Miami, Florida, where he attended Miami Northwestern Senior High School. As a junior, Cooper missed much of the season with an injury, but still managed to be one of quarterback Teddy Bridgewater's primary targets and had 16 receptions for 175 yards and four touchdowns. Cooper was dominant on the 7-on-7 circuit at various college campuses before his senior season. Cooper had a show-out performance at Alabama's summer camp, and that quickly led to an offer from Nick Saban and the Crimson Tide. As a senior, Cooper had in 33 receptions for 722 yards and six touchdowns. He was a first-team FHSAA 8A All-State selection, as well as the number-four player on Orlando Sentinel's Florida Top 100. Cooper was invited to play at the 2012 Under Armour All-America Game, where he had a 75-yard touchdown reception and a 93-yard punt return for a score. In addition to being a standout in football, Cooper also starred in basketball and track at Miami Northwestern.

Cooper was a consensus four-star prospect. He was listed as the number 45 in the Rivals100, and was considered the number-six wide receiver and number-eight player in Florida by Rivals.com. ESPNU listed Cooper as the nation's number-seven wideout and number-46 overall prospect in the ESPNU 150 while ranking him 25th in the ESPNU Southeast Top 100 and number 12 in Florida. Cooper was ranked as the number-six wide receiver and the number-10 player in the state of Florida by 247Sports.com, which had him 55th in their Top247. Scout.com rated Cooper as the number-12 pass catcher in the nation and 86th overall prospect. He chose Alabama over Florida State, Miami, and Ohio State, among others. Cooper announced his verbal commitment to the University of Alabama on September 22, 2011.

== College career ==
As a freshman at Alabama, Cooper played in all 14 games, including starts in the final nine games. He led the team with 59 receptions for 1,000 yards and 11 touchdowns. The 11 touchdowns broke Alabama's 62-year-old record by Al Lary. Cooper's receptions and receiving yards broke Julio Jones's Alabama freshman records. During the SEC Championship, Cooper had eight receptions for 128 yards and a touchdown in the 32–28 victory over Georgia, including the go-ahead touchdown with three minutes left in the game. In Alabama's 2013 BCS National Championship Game 42–14 victory over Notre Dame, Cooper led all Alabama receivers with six receptions for 105 yards and two touchdowns. He earned consensus Freshman All-American honors and was selected to the SEC All-Freshman team by the league coaches.

As a sophomore in 2013, Cooper played in 12 games with seven starts, missing two games due to injury. He had 45 receptions for a team-high 736 yards and four touchdowns. Cooper had his best game of the season against Auburn in the Iron Bowl, recording six receptions for 178 yards, including a school record 99-yard touchdown reception from quarterback A. J. McCarron. During the Sugar Bowl against Oklahoma, Cooper had nine receptions for 121 yards in the 45–31 loss.

As a junior in 2014, Cooper set numerous single-season and career records for Alabama. Against Tennessee, he broke Alabama's single game receiving yards record, finishing with 224. Cooper later matched the record against Auburn. For the season, he had 124 receptions for 1,727 yards and 16 touchdowns, both school records. In addition, Cooper's 124 receptions were an SEC record and led the NCAA. He became Alabama's all-time leader in receptions (228), receiving yards (3,463), and receiving touchdowns (31). Cooper was a finalist for the Heisman Trophy, finishing third behind Marcus Mariota and Melvin Gordon. He won the Biletnikoff Award that season and was also named a unanimous All-American.

After his junior season, Cooper entered the 2015 NFL draft.

== Professional career ==
=== Pre-draft ===
Cooper was considered one of the best wide receivers in the 2015 draft class, together with Kevin White. In most mock drafts, Cooper was projected to be a top-10 pick, with some having him as high as the fourth pick in the 2015 NFL draft.

Pre-draft measurables
| Height | Weight | Arm length | Hand span | Wingspan | 40-yard dash | 10-yard split | 20-yard split | 20-yard shuttle | Three-cone drill | Vertical jump | Broad jump | Wonderlic |
|---|---|---|---|---|---|---|---|---|---|---|---|---|
| 6 ft 0 7/8 in (1.85 m) | 211 lb (96 kg) | 31 1/2 in (0.80 m) | 10 in (0.25 m) | 6 ft 4 1/4 in (1.94 m) | 4.42 s | 1.61 s | 2.63 s | 3.98 s | 6.71 s | 34.0 in (0.86 m) | 10 ft 0 in (3.05 m) | 21 |
All values from NFL Combine/Pro Day

=== Oakland Raiders ===
==== 2015 season ====
The Oakland Raiders selected Cooper in the first round with the fourth overall pick in the 2015 NFL draft.

Cooper was initially assigned the jersey number 19, but following the release of fellow receiver James Jones, he switched to number 89. Cooper made his NFL debut on September 13, 2015. He had five receptions for 47 yards in the 33–13 loss to the Cincinnati Bengals. In the next game against the Baltimore Ravens, he recorded seven receptions for 109 yards and his first NFL touchdown on a 68-yard pass from Derek Carr during the 37–33 victory. The following week, Cooper had a franchise rookie record eight receptions for 134 yards in a 27–20 road victory over the Cleveland Browns, becoming the first Raiders receiver with consecutive 100+ yard receiving games since Randy Moss in 2005. Through three games, his 290 receiving yards were third in NFL history. On November 8, 2015, Cooper passed Tim Brown's record for rookie receptions (43) in a 38–35 road loss to the Pittsburgh Steelers.

On December 20, 2015, Cooper became the first rookie in franchise history to reach the 1,000-yard mark and the only receiver in the club to reach that same mark since Randy Moss did so in 2005. His 72 receptions are also franchise rookie records. Two days later, Cooper was selected as an alternate for the Pro Bowl, alongside teammates Derek Carr and Latavius Murray; he replaced Brandon Marshall and played. Cooper was named to the PFWA NFL All-Rookie Team for 2015.

==== 2016 season ====
Cooper put together a solid second season in the NFL. During the season opener against the New Orleans Saints, he had six receptions for 137 yards in a narrow 35–34 road victory. During Week 5 against the San Diego Chargers, he had six receptions for 138 yards and a touchdown in a 34–31 victory. Three weeks later against the Tampa Bay Buccaneers, he had his best game of the season with 12 receptions for 173 yards and a touchdown in a 30–24 overtime road victory.

Cooper finished his second professional season with 83 receptions for 1,153 yards and five touchdowns. He was named to his second consecutive Pro Bowl on December 20, 2016. Cooper was also ranked 53rd by his peers on the NFL Top 100 Players of 2017.

==== 2017 season ====
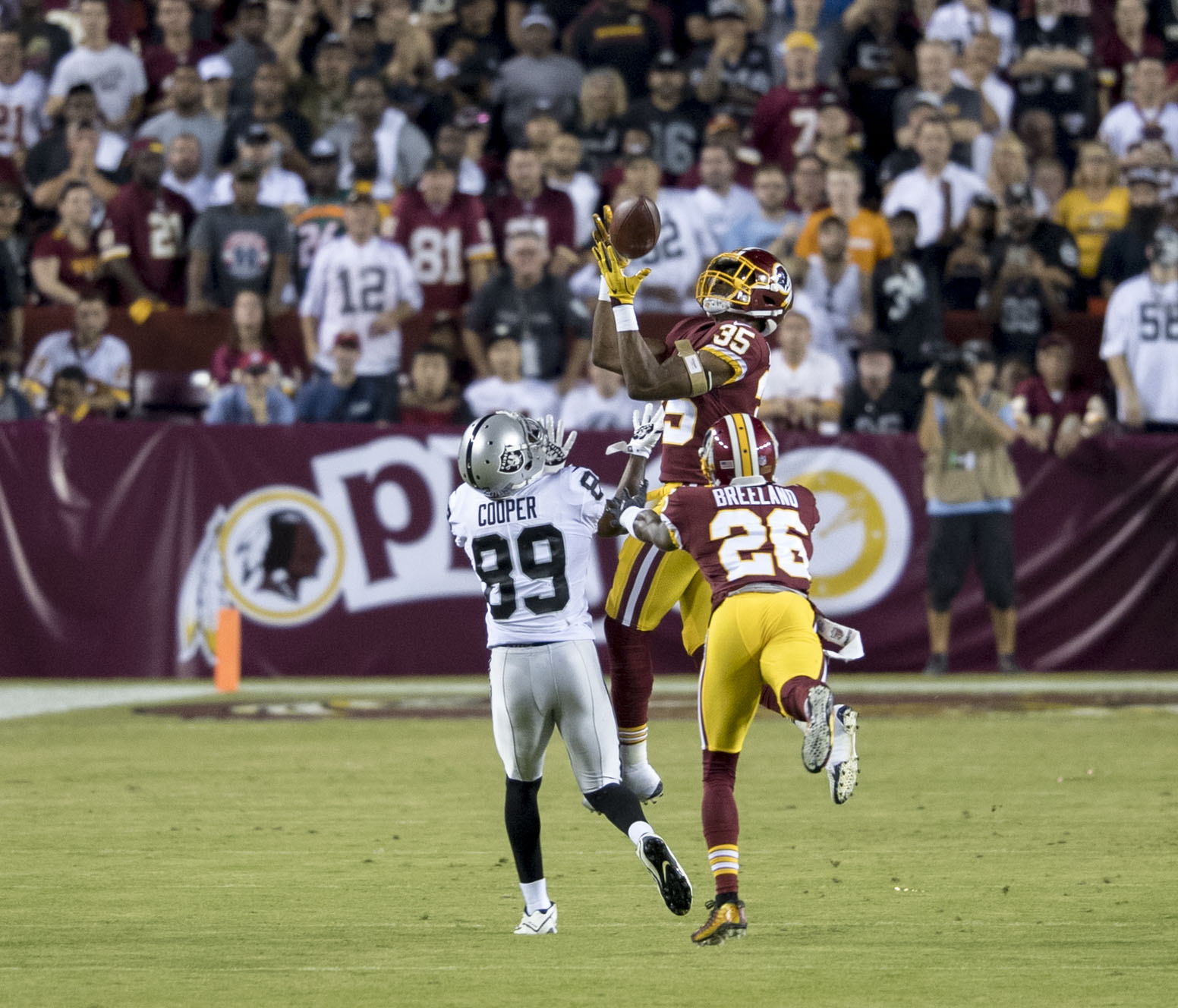
Montae Nicholson of the Washington Redskins makes an interception over Cooper.

During the season opener against the Tennessee Titans, Cooper had only five receptions for 62 yards on 13 targets, though one was a touchdown. After having 33 yards in Week 2, Cooper had three consecutive games with less than 10 receiving yards. However, in a 31–30 victory over the Kansas City Chiefs during Week 7 on Thursday Night Football, Cooper caught 11 passes for a then-career-high 210 yards and two touchdowns. His yardage was the most by any NFL player at that point in the 2017 season, the second-most in franchise history, and the first 200+ yard game in franchise history since 1965. With his spectacular performance in Week 7, Cooper was named AFC Offensive Player of the Week. In the season finale against the Los Angeles Chargers, Cooper caught three passes for 115 yards and an 87-yard touchdown in the 30–10 loss. He was later revealed to have struggled throughout the latter half of the season with an ankle injury that hampered his play.

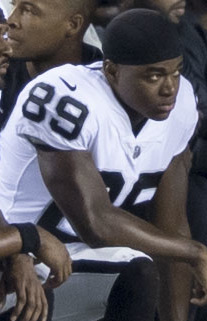
Cooper in 2017

Cooper finished the 2017 season recording career lows with 48 receptions for 680 yards but did have a career-high seven touchdowns.

==== 2018 season ====
On April 22, 2018, the Raiders exercised the fifth-year option on Cooper's contract.

During Week 4 against the Browns, Cooper caught eight passes for 128 yards and a touchdown in a 45–42 overtime victory. Two weeks later against the Seattle Seahawks in London, Cooper suffered a concussion and was knocked unconscious. The Raiders went on to lose 27–3.

=== Dallas Cowboys ===
==== 2018 season ====
On October 22, 2018, Cooper was traded to the Dallas Cowboys in exchange for a first-round pick (27th overall, Johnathan Abram) in the 2019 NFL draft.

In his first game with the Cowboys on November 5, Cooper led the team with five receptions for 58 yards and a touchdown as the Cowboys lost to the Titans by a score of 28–14. On Thanksgiving, Cooper had eight receptions for 180 yards and two touchdowns, including a 90-yard touchdown catch in the third quarter as the Cowboys defeated the Washington Redskins by a score of 31–23. He was named the NFC Offensive Player of the Week for his performance. Two weeks later against the Philadelphia Eagles, Cooper had 10 receptions for a career-high 217 yards and three touchdowns. His final touchdown, in overtime, came off a deflection from Rasul Douglas as the Cowboys won 29–23. Cooper's 217 receiving yards were the most by one player for a single game in the 2018 season. For his performance, Cooper earned his second NFC Offensive Player of the Week award.

The Cowboys finished atop the NFC East with a 10–6 record and were the #4-seed for the NFC playoffs. In the Wild Card Round victory over the Seattle Seahawks, Cooper recorded seven receptions for 106 yards. In the Divisional Round against the Los Angeles Rams, he had six receptions for 65 yards and a touchdown in the 30–22 road loss. On January 21, 2019, Cooper was added to the NFC Pro Bowl roster as an injury replacement for New Orleans Saints wide receiver Michael Thomas. In 15 games and starts on the Raiders and Cowboys rosters during the 2018 season, Cooper accumulated 75 receptions for 1,005 yards and seven touchdowns. He was ranked 64th by his fellow players on the NFL Top 100 Players of 2019.

==== 2019 season ====
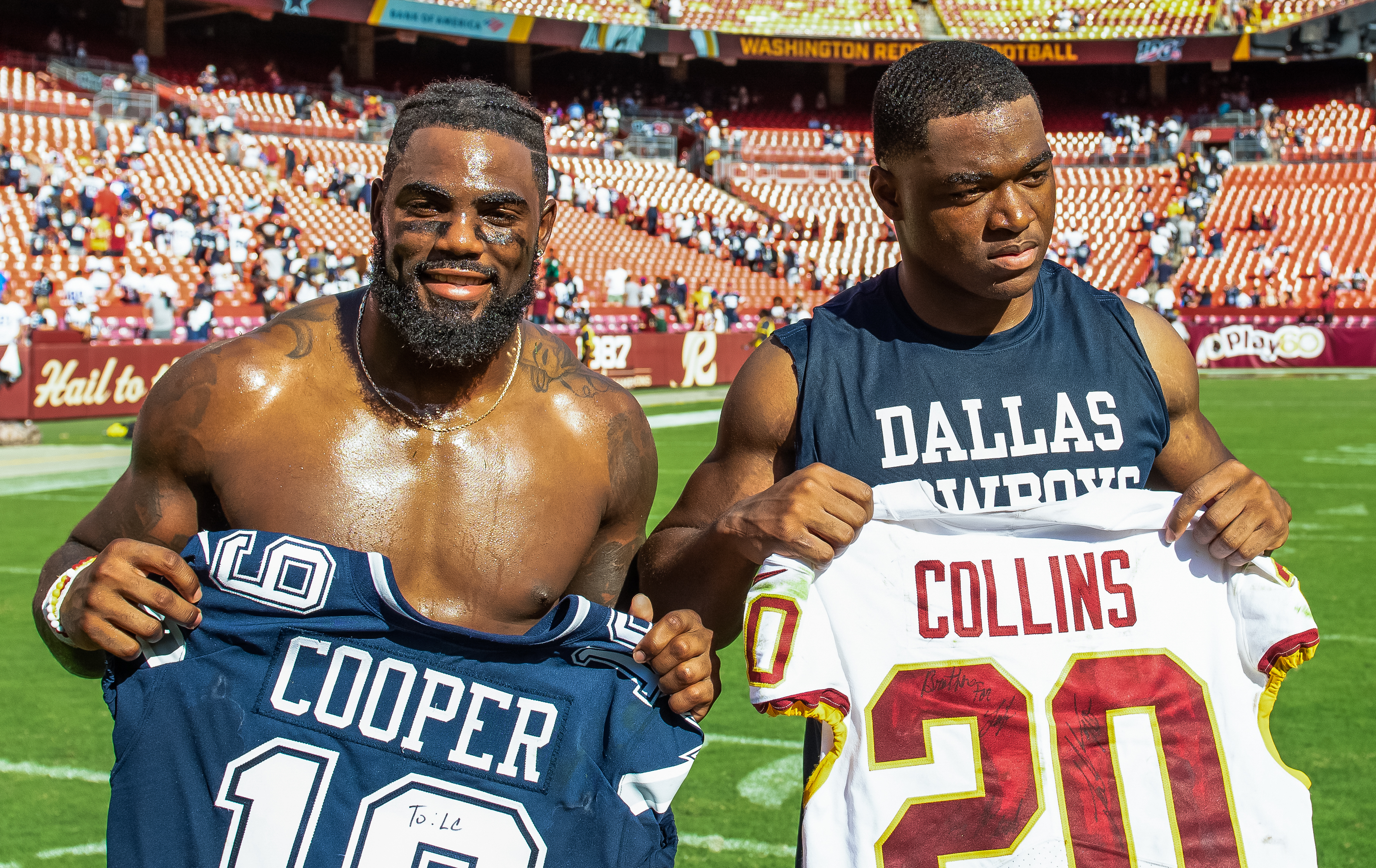
Cooper alongside Landon Collins in a game against the Washington Redskins

On July 1, 2019, Cooper stated, "I think the change of scenery was really necessary, I really, honestly, don't think if I would've stayed with the Raiders last season that I would've been able to flourish and reach some heights that I was able to reach as a Cowboy. So, it was definitely necessary."

During the season opener against the New York Giants, Cooper had six receptions for 106 yards and a touchdown in the 35–17 victory. During Week 5, Cooper caught 11 passes for a career-high 226 yards and a touchdown as the Cowboys lost to the Green Bay Packers by a score of 34–24. During Week 10 against the Minnesota Vikings on Sunday Night Football, he recorded 11 receptions for 147 yards and a touchdown in the 28–24 loss. During Week 14 against the Chicago Bears on Thursday Night Football, Cooper had six receptions for 83 yards and a touchdown in the 31–24 road loss. During the game, he reached 1,000 receiving yards on the season. Cooper was named to his fourth career Pro Bowl for his performance in 2019.

Cooper finished the 2019 season with 79 receptions for a career-high 1,189 yards and eight touchdowns in 16 games and starts. He was ranked 49th by his fellow players on the NFL Top 100 Players of 2020.

==== 2020 season ====
On March 17, 2020, Cooper signed a five-year contract extension with the Cowboys worth $100 million, which featured $60 million guaranteed, $40 million at signing, and a $20 million injury designation that becomes fully guaranteed in 2022.

The 2020 season saw Cooper reach at least 100 receiving yards in four games. Despite having four quarterbacks start over the season due to injuries, Cooper finished the season with a career-high 92 receptions for 1,114 yards and five touchdowns in 16 games and 15 starts.

==== 2021 season ====
During the season opener against the Buccaneers, Cooper recorded 13 receptions for 139 yards and two touchdowns in the narrow 31–29 road loss. His 13 receptions set a new mark for the most by a Cowboys player in a season-opening game. During a Week 8 20–16 road victory over the Vikings, Cooper caught eight passes for 122 yards and the game-winning touchdown. Cooper missed Weeks 11 and 12 after testing positive for COVID-19.

Cooper finished the 2021 season with 68 receptions for 865 yards and a career-high eight touchdowns (tied for the team lead) in 15 games and 14 starts. During the Wild Card Round against the San Francisco 49ers, he had six receptions for 64 yards and a touchdown in the 23–17 loss.

On January 14, 2022, Cooper was fined $14,650 by the NFL after he attended a Dallas Mavericks game without wearing a face mask, a violation of COVID-19 protocols.

=== Cleveland Browns ===
==== 2022 season ====
On March 16, 2022, Cooper was traded to the Cleveland Browns in exchange for a fifth-round pick (#155-Matt Waletzko) and a swap of sixth-round picks in the 2022 NFL draft.

During Week 11 against the Bills, Cooper recorded eight receptions for 113 yards and two touchdowns in the 31–23 road loss. During Week 17 against the Commanders, he had three receptions for 105 yards and two touchdowns in the 24–10 road victory.

Cooper finished the 2022 season with 78 receptions for 1,160 yards and a career-high nine touchdowns in 17 games and starts.

==== 2023 season ====
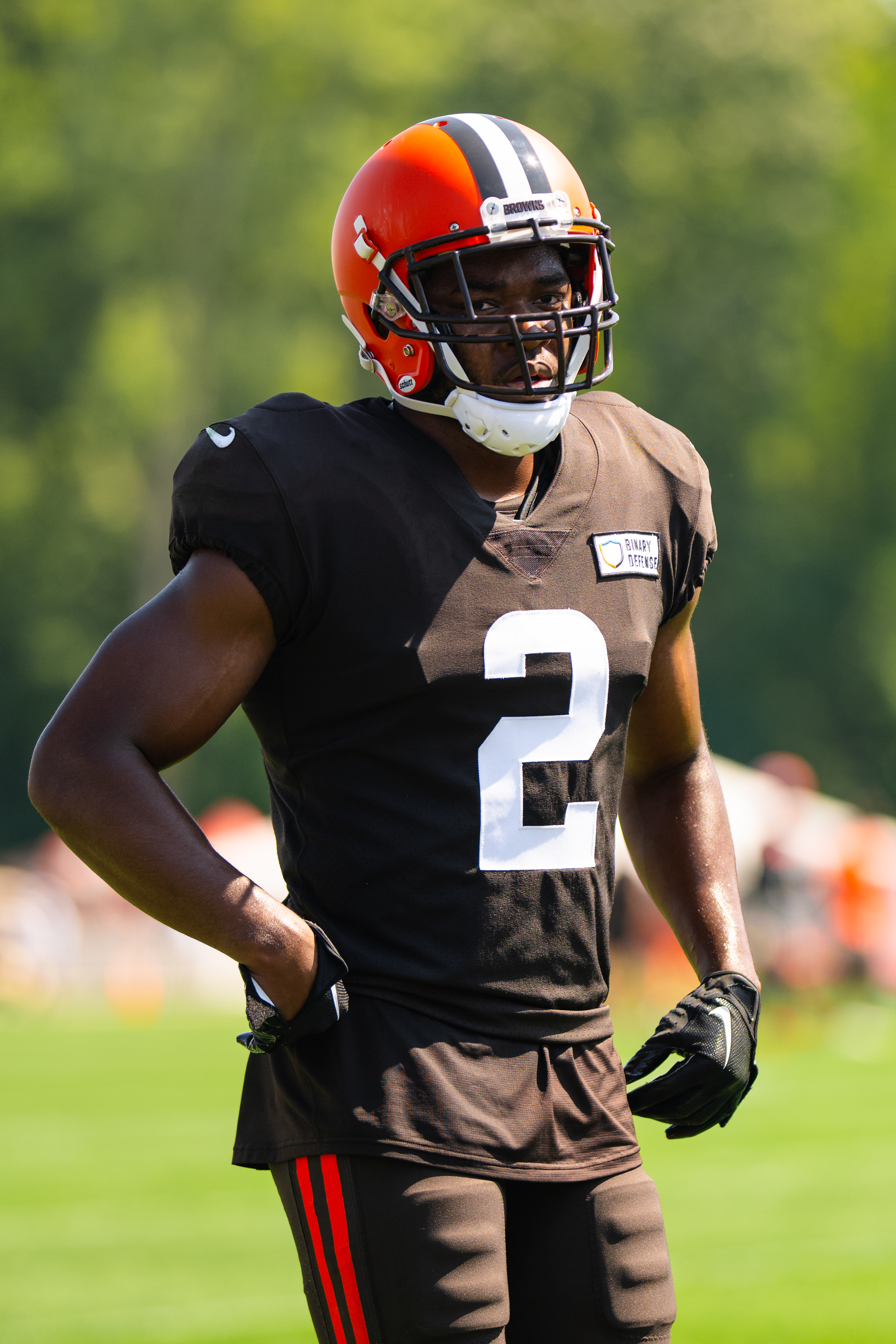
Cooper in 2023

On December 24, 2023, Cooper had 11 receptions for a career-high 265 yards in a 36–22 victory over the Houston Texans, which also broke the Browns single-game receiving record previously held by Josh Gordon. Furthermore, Cooper became just the second player in NFL history to record a 200+ yard game for three different teams, along with Terrell Owens. Cooper was named AFC Offensive Player of the Week for his historic game against the Texans. Cooper was also named as a Pro Bowler for the fifth time.

Cooper finished the 2023 season with 72 receptions for a career-high 1,250 yards and five touchdowns in 15 games and starts. He had five games with over 100 receiving yards on the season. Cooper became the first wide receiver to record consecutive 1,000-yard seasons for the Browns. He was ranked 70th by his fellow players on the NFL Top 100 Players of 2024.

==== 2024 season ====
In six games with the Browns, Cooper struggled to connect with quarterback Deshaun Watson as the Browns started the season with a 1–5 record. Cooper caught 24 of 53 targets for 250 yards and two touchdowns, both of which came in a Week 3 loss to the New York Giants.

=== Buffalo Bills ===
On October 15, 2024, the Browns traded Cooper and a 2025 sixth-round pick to the Buffalo Bills in exchange for a 2025 third-round pick and a 2026 seventh-round pick.

Cooper was able to suit up for the Week 7 matchup against the Titans, catching four passes for 66 yards and a touchdown in his Bills debut as the Bills won 34–10. He missed Weeks 9 and 10 with a wrist injury. During a Week 13 victory over the San Francisco 49ers, Cooper received a pass from quarterback Josh Allen and lateraled the ball back to Allen for a touchdown, giving Allen both a passing touchdown and receiving touchdown on the same play.

Cooper finished the 2024 season with 44 receptions for 547 yards and four touchdowns.

=== Las Vegas Raiders ===
On August 25, 2025, Cooper signed a one-year, $3.5 million contract with the Las Vegas Raiders, reuniting him with the team that drafted him.

On September 4, 2025, before the regular season began, Cooper announced his retirement from the NFL after 10 seasons.

== Career statistics ==
=== NFL ===
Legend
| **Bold** | Career high |

==== Regular season ====
| Year | Team | Games | | Receiving | | | | | Rushing | | | | | Fumbles | |
| Year | Team | GP | GS | Rec | Yds | Avg | Lng | TD | Att | Yds | Avg | Lng | TD | Fum | Lost |
|---|---|---|---|---|---|---|---|---|---|---|---|---|---|---|---|
| 2015 | OAK | 16 | 15 | 72 | 1,070 | 14.9 | 68 | 6 | 3 | −3 | −1.0 | 2 | 0 | 1 | 1 |
| 2016 | OAK | 16 | 14 | 83 | 1,153 | 13.9 | 64 | 5 | 1 | 0 | 0.0 | 0 | 0 | **2** | 0 |
| 2017 | OAK | 14 | 12 | 48 | 680 | 14.2 | 87 | 7 | 1 | 4 | 4.0 | 4 | 0 | 1 | 0 |
| 2018 | OAK | 6 | 6 | 22 | 280 | 12.7 | 36 | 1 | 1 | 9 | 9.0 | 9 | 0 | 0 | 0 |
| 2018 | DAL | 9 | 9 | 53 | 725 | 13.7 | **90** | 6 | 1 | 11 | **11.0** | **11** | 0 | **2** | **2** |
| 2019 | DAL | 16 | 16 | 79 | 1,189 | 15.1 | 53 | 8 | 1 | 6 | 6.0 | 6 | 0 | 0 | 0 |
| 2020 | DAL | 16 | 15 | **92** | 1,114 | 12.1 | 69 | 5 | **6** | **14** | 2.3 | 10 | 0 | 0 | 0 |
| 2021 | DAL | 15 | 14 | 68 | 865 | 12.7 | 41 | 8 | 0 | 0 | 0.0 | 0 | 0 | 1 | 0 |
| 2022 | CLE | 17 | 17 | 78 | 1,160 | 14.9 | 55 | **9** | 0 | 0 | 0.0 | 0 | 0 | 0 | 0 |
| 2023 | CLE | 15 | 15 | 72 | **1,250** | **17.4** | 75 | 5 | 0 | 0 | 0.0 | 0 | 0 | **2** | 1 |
| 2024 | CLE | 6 | 6 | 24 | 250 | 10.4 | 24 | 2 | 0 | 0 | 0.0 | 0 | 0 | 0 | 0 |
| 2024 | BUF | 8 | 4 | 20 | 297 | 14.9 | 30 | 2 | 0 | 0 | 0.0 | 0 | 0 | 0 | 0 |
| Career | | 154 | 143 | 711 | 10,033 | 14.1 | 90 | 64 | 14 | 41 | 2.9 | 11 | 0 | 9 | 4 |

==== Postseason ====
| Year | Team | Games | | Receiving | | | | | Fumbles | |
| Year | Team | GP | GS | Rec | Yds | Avg | Lng | TD | Fum | Lost |
|---|---|---|---|---|---|---|---|---|---|---|
| 2016 | OAK | 1 | 1 | 2 | 10 | 5.0 | 9 | 0 | 0 | 0 |
| 2018 | DAL | 2 | 2 | **13** | **171** | 13.2 | **34** | **1** | **1** | 0 |
| 2021 | DAL | 1 | 1 | 6 | 64 | 10.7 | 20 | **1** | 0 | 0 |
| 2023 | CLE | 1 | 1 | 4 | 59 | **14.8** | 19 | 0 | 0 | 0 |
| 2024 | BUF | 3 | 1 | 6 | 41 | 6.8 | 10 | 0 | 0 | 0 |
| Career | | 8 | 6 | 31 | 345 | 11.1 | 34 | 2 | 1 | 0 |

=== College ===
Legend
| | Led the NCAA |
| **Bold** | Career high |

| Season | Team | GP | Receiving | | | | | | |
| Season | Team | GP | Rec | Yds | Avg | Lng | TD | 100+ | Y/G |
|---|---|---|---|---|---|---|---|---|---|
| 2012 | Alabama | 14 | 59 | 1,000 | **16.9** | 54 | 11 | 5 | 71.4 |
| 2013 | Alabama | 12 | 45 | 736 | 16.4 | **99** | 4 | 2 | 61.3 |
| 2014 | Alabama | 14 | **124** | **1,727** | 13.9 | 80 | **16** | **7** | **123.4** |
| Total | | 40 | 228 | 3,463 | 15.2 | 99 | 31 | 14 | 86.6 |

== Career highlights ==
=== Awards and honors ===
NFL

- 5× Pro Bowl (2015, 2016, 2018, 2019, 2023)
- PFWA All-Rookie Team (2015)
- 4× NFL Top 100 — 53rd (2017), 64th (2019), 49th (2020), 70th (2024)

College

- BCS national champion (2012)
- Fred Biletnikoff Award (2014)
- Paul Warfield Trophy (2014)
- Unanimous All-American (2014)
- NCAA receptions leader (2014)
- SEC Offensive Player of the Year (2014)
- First-team All-SEC (2014)

=== Records ===
==== Raiders franchise records ====
- First rookie to record 1,000 receiving yards

==== Browns franchise records ====
- Most receiving yards in a game: 265 (Week 16, 2023)

== Personal life ==
Cooper is an avid chess player. He was first captivated by the game as an elementary school student in northwest Miami, and as a football player, Cooper related chess strategies to his play on the field. Cooper played in Chess.com's BlitzChamps, a rapid tournament for NFL players, and came in second place behind Chidobe Awuzie.

== See also ==
- List of Las Vegas Raiders first-round draft picks
- List of NCAA major college football yearly receiving leaders
