= Carlos Véliz (shot putter) =

Cuban shot putter

Personal information
- Full name: Carlos Véliz Wilburt
- Born: 12 August 1987 (age 38) Báguanos, Holguín, Cuba
- Height: 1.87 m (6 ft 2 in)
- Weight: 95 kg (209 lb)

Sport
- Country: Cuba
- Sport: Track and field
- Event: Shot put

Achievements and titles
- Personal best(s): 21.40 m 20.32 m (6 kg)
Medal record
Pan American Games
Silver medal – second place	2011 Guadalajara	Shot put
Central American and Caribbean Championships
Gold medal – first place	2009 Havana	Shot put
- Updated on 22 June 2013

Carlos Véliz (born 12 August 1987 in Holguín) is a male shot putter from Cuba. His personal best throw is 21.40 metres, achieved on 12 June 2011 in Brazzaville. However the mark had to be declared irregular because of the use of a light implement.

== Career ==
- 2006

Véliz's international career began with the World Junior Championships in Beijing, where he finished in a respectable 6th Place.

- 2007

Véliz competed at the Pan American Games in Rio de Janeiro, throwing 19.75m for the bronze medal.

- 2008

Véliz improved his personal best significantly on 13 May in Havana, with a throw of 20.72m. Also in Havana, he took the Central American and Caribbean Championships Shot Put title, with a throw of 20.10m. These throws ensured his qualification for the 2008 Beijing Olympic Games. In the Shot Put competition, he eventually finished 12th in Qualifying Group A with a throw of 19.58m, not enough to ensure his progression to the final.

- 2009

Again, Véliz qualified for a major championships, the World Championships in Berlin, but once again disappointed on the day, throwing 19.62m, over a metre behind his personal best, and just shy of a metre behind his season best throw of 20.40m

- 2010

Véliz added to his international medal tally with a bronze medal at the 14th Ibero-American Championships, with an effort of 20.20m. His season's best throw was 20.41m.

- 2011

Véliz made a significant improvement on his personal best, throwing 21.40m at Brazzaville, catapulting him into the World Top 10 .

== Other Events ==
Véliz was a promising discus thrower as a junior (U20) athlete, and has a personal best throw with the 1.75 kg discus of 55.03m

== Personal bests ==
Event	Best	Venue	Date
Outdoor
Shot put	20.76 m A	(Mexico) Guadalajara	25 October 2011
Discus throw (1.75 kg)	55.03 m	(Cuba) Havana	13 May 2005
Indoor
Shot put	19.74 m	(Spain) Sabadell	25 February 2012

== Achievements ==
Year	Competition	Venue	Position	Event	Notes
Representing Cuba
2006	World Junior Championships	Beijing, China	6th	Shot put (6 kg)	19.76 m
2007	ALBA Games	Caracas, Venezuela	1st	Shot put	19.54 m
2007	Pan American Games	Rio de Janeiro, Brazil	3rd	Shot put	19.75 m
2008	Olympic Games	Beijing, China	24th (q)	Shot put	19.58 m
2009	ALBA Games	Havana, Cuba	2nd	Shot put	19.28 m
2009	Central American and Caribbean Championships	Havana, Cuba	1st	Shot put	20.10 m
2009	World Championships	Berlin, Germany	24th (q)	Shot put	19.62 m
2010	Ibero-American Championships	San Fernando, Spain	3rd	Shot put	20.20 m
2011	World Championships	Daegu, South Korea	12th	Shot put	19.70 m
2011	Pan American Games	Guadalajara, Mexico	2nd	Shot put	20.76 m
2012	World Indoor Championship	Istanbul, Turkey	13th (q)	Shot put	19.64 m
2012	Ibero-American Championships	Barquisimeto, Venezuela	2nd	Shot put	19.97 m
2012	Olympic Games	London, United Kingdom	34th (q)	Shot put	18.57 m
