= 2012 Hawaii Bowl =

2012 Sheraton Hawaii Bowl
Fresno State Bulldogs	SMU Mustangs
(9–3)	(6–6)
Mountain West	C-USA
10	43
Head coach: Tim DeRuyter	Head coach: June Jones
	1	2	3	4	Total
Fresno State	0	0	7	3	10
SMU	0	22	7	14	43
- Date: December 24, 2012
- Season: 2012
- Stadium: Aloha Stadium
- Location: Honolulu (Halawa), Hawaii
- MVP: DE Margus Hunt, SMU; WR Davante Adams, Fresno State
- Favorite: Fresno St. 12
- National anthem: Tahiti Rey and Jason Alan
- Referee: Jim Farmer (WAC)
- Halftime show: Mailani
- Attendance: 30,024
- Payout: US$650,000 (per team)

United States TV coverage
- Network: ESPN
- Announcers: Carter Blackburn (play-by-play); Kelly Stouffer (analyst); Kaylee Hartung (sideline)

The 2012 Sheraton Hawaii Bowl was a postseason American college football bowl game held on Christmas Eve 2012, at Aloha Stadium in Honolulu. The eleventh edition of the Hawaii Bowl, sponsored by Sheraton Hotels and Resorts, began at 3:00 p.m. HST and aired on ESPN. It featured the SMU Mustangs from Conference USA against the Mountain West Conference co-champion Fresno State Bulldogs, and was the final game of the 2012 NCAA Division I FBS football season for both teams. The Mustangs accepted their invitation after compiling a 6–6 record in the regular season, while the Bulldogs accepted their invitation with a 9–3 regular season record.

The pre-game buildup focused primarily on the strong rushing attacks of both teams as well as the overall sound offense of Fresno State. Most analysts predicted a resounding victory by Fresno State. Fresno State was a 12-point favorite over the Mustangs. Contrary to predictions, SMU won the game by a score of 43–10, largely thanks to the play of defensive end Margus Hunt, who forced two fumbles and totaled three sacks (including one safety) as well as two interceptions that were returned for touchdowns. Consequently, Hunt and Fresno State's Davante Adams, who totaled 13 receptions for 144 yards and a touchdown, were named the game's co-Most Valuable Player (MVP).

== Teams ==
Conference USA has had its tie-in to the Hawaii Bowl ever since the game's establishment in 2002. The Mountain West Conference started its affiliation with the game when the hometown Hawaii Warriors moved to said conference (previously, Hawaii, and said tie-in, belonged to the Western Athletic Conference). In fact, Hawaii has an automatic bid to the bowl game should it be eligible; however, because of its 3–9 record in 2012, it was not bowl-eligible, leaving the spot to the fifth bowl-eligible Mountain West team. The 2012 Hawaii Bowl was the seventh meeting between Fresno State and SMU, the last one coming in 2004.

This was the Mustangs' second Hawaii Bowl, following the 2009 game where they defeated the Nevada Wolf Pack by a score of 45–10 (SMU's first bowl bid since playing in Hawaii in the 1984 Aloha Bowl, and their first since the program was relaunched in 1989 after being shut down for two years due to massive NCAA rules violations). It also was the Mustangs' final game as a member of Conference USA before they moved to the Big East Conference in 2013.

== Pregame buildup ==
One of the keys to the game, according to ESPN.com blogger Matt Fortuna, was to stop the run. Both teams had 1,000+ yard rushers (Zach Line for SMU, Robbie Rouse for Fresno State), but SMU's rush defense (24th in FBS) was better than Fresno State's (73rd in FBS). Many analysts predicted that Fresno State would emerge victorious, some going as far as to predict a blowout, but said that for SMU to emerge victorious, they would have to win the field position battle as well as create turnovers.

=== Fresno State ===
In their first season in the Mountain West, the Bulldogs became co-champions with a 7–1 conference record. This was the Bulldogs' first appearance in the Hawaii Bowl. Coming into the 2012 season, Bulldogs' coach Tim DeRuyter said that his team would challenge for a Mountain West Conference title. After making good on that promise, the Bulldogs attempted to achieve their first bowl victory since the 2007 Humanitarian Bowl. A victory in the Hawaii Bowl would have given Fresno State a 10-win season for the first time since 2001, when quarterback Derek Carr's older brother David was the Bulldogs' quarterback.

==== Offense ====
Fresno State was led offensively by their quarterback, junior Derek Carr, who finished 14th in the country in quarterback rating (155.9), 8th in passing yards (4,104), and tied for 3rd in touchdowns (37). Carr was named the Mountain West Conference Player of the Year and announced before the game that he would return to Fresno State to play his senior season. The Bulldogs were riding a five-game winning streak coming into the game; the fewest points they scored during any game of that streak was 42. The Bulldogs' rushing attack was led by 5-foot, 7-inch (1.70 m) 190-pound (86 kg) senior running back Robbie Rouse, who rushed for 1490 yards, which ranked 14th in the country. Rouse, who rushed for over 100 yards in nine games during the regular season, was also Fresno State's second-leading receiver (in terms of receptions), catching the ball 63 times for 435 yards. Carr's top target in the passing game was redshirt freshman wideout Davante Adams, who had broken several school records during his freshman year including becoming just the seventh freshman in school history to record over 100 yards receiving in a single game and setting the single-game school record for a freshman by recording 12 receptions against Oregon. In total, Adams amassed 102 catches for 1312 yards and 14 touchdowns, all of which led the team. His efforts earned him a spot on Phil Steele's fourth-team All-America squad and accolades as the Mountain West Conference Freshman of the Year. Fresno State's starter at tight end was senior Marcel Jensen, who totaled 20 receptions for 339 yards and 4 touchdowns, all of which were career highs. Jensen was an honorable mention all-conference honoree. The Bulldogs' offensive line was anchored by junior left tackle Austin Wentworth, who achieved first-team all-conference honors.

==== Defense ====
Described as "well-rounded and explosive" by SBNation.com, Fresno State's defense was paramount to their success during the season. Their 3-4 defense was installed by their first-year coach, DeRuyter, and proved effective throughout the season. They finished third in the NCAA in interceptions, amassing 22 of them. 8 of those 22 interceptions came from Fresno State's defensive leader, Mountain West Conference Defensive Player of the Year, first-team All-American, and NCAA leader in interceptions senior safety Phillip Thomas, who also recorded a career-high 82 tackles and finished second on the team with 4 sacks, the second-most by a defensive back in the country. Fresno State's defense was also successful rushing the passer; they finished ninth in the NCAA in sacks with 39 of them. Fresno State's front seven was led by sophomore Tyeler Davison, who achieved first team all-conference accolades and recorded six tackles for loss during the season. The Bulldogs' leader in sacks was junior nose tackle Andy Jennings, who achieved 5.5 of them. The Bulldogs' linebackers were led by senior Travis Brown. Brown totaled 68 tackles and was a first team all-conference selection.

=== SMU ===
Coming into the 2012 season, SMU was widely expected to finish third in the Conference USA West Division. They exceeded that expectation by finishing second in the C-USA West and earning a bid to the Hawaii Bowl. A year after his season ended due to a foot injury, running back Zach Line was poised to have a breakout year and was expected to win the Conference USA Offensive Player of the Year award.

==== Offense ====
At quarterback, University of Texas transfer Garrett Gilbert started for the Mustangs and struggled; he totaled a 53% completion percentage, 15 touchdowns, and 15 interceptions, the latter of which was tied for ninth-most in the NCAA. The Mustangs' offensive leader was three-time All-Conference USA player and 2012 Conference USA Offensive Player of the Year running back Zach Line, who had totaled 4,185 rushing yards and 37 touchdowns in his career coming into the game. Line was also the Mustangs' fourth-leading receiver (in terms of receptions), totaling 33 for 229 yards. SMU's wide receiving corps featured a trio of standouts: senior Darius Johnson, junior Jeremy Johnson, and sophomore Der'rikk Thompson. The former Johnson, who is one of just two SMU players ever to record three 60-catch seasons, led the Mustangs with 787 receiving yards from 64 receptions which included 5 touchdowns. The latter Johnson totaled 67 receptions, which led the team, for 679 yards and 3 touchdowns. Thompson, who led the trio by averaging 13.0 yards per reception, caught the ball 41 times for 535 yards and 4 touchdowns during the regular season. Coach June Jones' spread offense did not employ a tight end, and none were on the roster for the Mustangs. The Mustangs' offensive line was led by senior Bryan Collins, who achieved 2nd team all-conference honors.

==== Defense ====
The Mustangs were defensively anchored by senior defensive end Margus Hunt, who achieved eight sacks en route to a first-team all-conference selection. Prior to the game, there was significant hype surrounding the defensive matchup between Fresno State's Davante Adams and SMU's cornerback junior Kenneth Acker, who intercepted the ball three times during the season. Acker achieved second-team all-conference accolades. SMU's defense also had an all-conference honoree in the linebacking corps, senior Ja'Gared Davis, who totaled 77 tackles during the season. The Mustangs were prolific in turnovers and led the Football Bowl Subdivision (FBS) in interceptions returned for touchdowns (8), tied for fourth in interceptions (21), and finished third in total takeaways (37). Despite their success with turnovers, the Mustangs were far more mediocre in scoring defense, in which they allowed 25.7 points per game (tied for 54th nationally), and total defense, in which they gave up 396.1 yards per game (62nd nationally).

== Game summary ==
=== Game notes ===
==== First quarter ====
SMU received the ball to start the game and marched down the field on an 8-play, 52-yard drive highlighted by a 37-yard run by quarterback Garrett Gilbert to set up a 41-yard field goal attempt by Chase Hover which he missed. Fresno State's subsequent drive lasted only two series and ended in a punt. The remainder of the first quarter's drives ended in punts. There were a total of three drives that went three-and-out in the quarter, two by SMU and one by Fresno State.

==== Second quarter ====
SMU struck first in the second quarter via a 17-yard rush from Gilbert, their quarterback, to put the Bulldogs up 7–0. Fresno State's ensuing drive started with a first down, but ended when quarterback Derek Carr was sacked by SMU defender Margus Hunt; Hunt forced a fumble that was recovered by the Mustangs at the Fresno State 16-yard line. SMU gained only three yards on their drive, but due to their excellent field position, kicker Chase Hover was able to convert a 30-yard field goal making it 10–0.

Fresno State's offensive woes continued on their next drive. On second down, Carr was sacked for a loss of 18 yards to the 6-yard line. On third down, Hunt recorded another sack which resulted in a safety to make the score 12–0 SMU. Zach Line rushed for an 8-yard touchdown to cap an 11-play, 67-yard drive after the safety. This made the score 19–0.

Hunt continued his fantastic first-half performance on Fresno State's next drive, forcing running back Robbie Rouse to fumble. It was recovered by safety Taylor Reed. Hover kicked a 48-yard field goal to make the score 22–0. Fresno State finally started to put together a solid drive at the end of the half including three consecutive first-down passes from Carr to Isaiah Burse for 16 yards, Greg Watson for 12 yards, and Davante Adams for 33 yards respectively that set up first and goal at the three-yard line with 0:39 remaining in the half. The Bulldogs failed to execute, however, and ended the half without scoring at all. The final play of the half was a pass to tight end Marcel Jensen in the end zone, but he dropped the ball, thus ending the scoring threat.

==== Third quarter ====
Since SMU had received the ball to start the game, Fresno State got possession to start the second half. The first play from scrimmage of the half was a 38-yard pass from Carr to Burse which got the Bulldogs up to the Mustangs' 41-yard line. The drive stalled from there, however, after a six-yard loss on a pass play, a false start penalty, a pass completed for no gain, and an incomplete pass. After a 42-yard punt that was returned for 4 yards, SMU was set up at their 14-yard line. The ensuing drive for SMU showed promise after they got into Bulldog territory, but an interception by Sean Alston returned for 50 yards to the SMU 15 ended any chance of scoring for the Mustangs. Fresno State finally put points on the board after setting up in the red zone; Carr threw a 6-yard pass to Adams making the score 22–7 after Quentin Breshears tacked on the point after. On the ensuing drive, SMU ran 7 plays for 75 yards in 3:20 in a drive that culminated with a 21-yard touchdown pass from Gilbert to Darius Johnson; the drive included a 27-yard rush by Zach Line as well as a 19-yard pass from Gilbert to Der'rikk Thompson. After the TD, the score was 29–7 SMU. The teams then exchanged punts for the remainder of the quarter.

==== Fourth quarter ====
Fresno State was able to run a 7-play, 72-yard drive to begin the fourth quarter that culminated with a 32-yard field goal by Breshears making the score 29–10. Any chance of a Bulldog comeback was quashed after Carr threw two interceptions returned for touchdowns to Reed and Hayden Greenbauer, the latter of which came with just 1:14 to play. The final score was 43–10, the Mustangs victorious.

==== Post-game ====
SMU's resounding victory was considered an upset, and during the game, the Mustangs set a single-season record for most interceptions returned for a touchdown (8), surpassing the 2011 Southern Miss Golden Eagles football team. Margus Hunt was named the game's Most Valuable Player because of his two-forced fumble, three-sack (including one safety) performance. In total, the Mustangs achieved seven sacks, the most Fresno State had surrendered in a single game all year. Davante Adams' third-quarter touchdown reception lengthened his streak to eight consecutive games with a touchdown reception, tying a Fresno State record that was set by Henry Ellard in 1982.

=== Scoring summary ===
Scoring summary

Quarter	Time	Drive			Team	Scoring information	Score	
Quarter	Time	Plays	Yards	TOP	Team	Scoring information	Fresno State	SMU
2	14:07	5	93	2:26	SMU	Garrett Gilbert 17-yard touchdown run, Chase Hover kick good	0	7
2	12:16	4	3	0:56	SMU	30-yard field goal by Chase Hover	0	10
2	10:50	-	-	-	SMU	Derek Carr tackled in end zone for a safety by Margus Hunt	0	12
2	5:24	11	67	5:26	SMU	Zach Line 8-yard touchdown run, Chase Hover kick good	0	19
2	1:37	4	-14	2:11	SMU	48-yard field goal by Chase Hover	0	22
3	10:21	3	15	1:05	Fresno St.	Davante Adams 6-yard touchdown reception from Derek Carr, Quentin Breshears kick good	7	22
3	7:01	7	75	3:20	SMU	Darius Johnson 21-yard touchdown reception from Garrett Gilbert, Chase Hover kick good	7	29
4	13:21	7	72	1:30	Fresno St.	32-yard field goal by Quentin Breshears	10	29
4	9:05	-	-	-	SMU	Interception returned 69 yards for touchdown by Taylor Reed, Chase Hover kick good	10	36
4	1:14	-	-	-	SMU	Interception returned 83 yards for touchdown by Hayden Greenbauer, Chase Hover kick good	10	43
"TOP" = time of possession. For other American football terms, see Glossary of American football.							Fresno State	SMU

=== Statistics ===
==== Team statistics ====
Statistics	FRES	SMU
First downs	21	15
Total offense, plays - yards	77-346	65-381
Rushes-yards (net)	22–16	37–169
Passing yards (net)	362	212
Passes, Comp-Att-Int	33-55-2	14–28–2
Time of Possession	26:41	33:19

==== Individual statistics ====
===== Passing =====
Team	Name	Comp./Att.	Yards	Touchdowns	Interceptions
Fresno St.	Derek Carr	33/54	362	1	2
SMU	Garrett Gilbert	14/28	212	1	2

===== Rushing =====
Team	Name	Rushes	Yards	Touchdowns
Fresno St.	Robbie Rouse	13	22	0
Fresno St.	Isaiah Burse	1	3	0
SMU	Garrett Gilbert	18	98	1
SMU	Zach Line	19	71	1

===== Receiving =====
Team	Name	Receptions	Yards	Touchdowns
Fresno St.	Davante Adams	13	144	1
Fresno St.	Isaiah Burse	4	89	0
Fresno St.	Greg Watson	5	48	0
Fresno St.	Robbie Rouse	5	29	0
Fresno St.	Marcel Jensen	1	29	0
SMU	Austin Fuller	4	84	0
SMU	Der'rikk Thompson	5	82	0
SMU	Darius Johnson	3	40	1
SMU	Darius Joseph	1	8	0
SMU	Zach Line	1	-2	0
