= 2009 European Athletics U23 Championships – Men's shot put =

The men's shot put event at the 2009 European Athletics U23 Championships was held in Kaunas, Lithuania, at S. Dariaus ir S. Girėno stadionas (Darius and Girėnas Stadium) on 16 July.

== Medalists ==
Gold	Valeriy Kokoyev; Russia
Silver	Nick Petersen; Denmark
Bronze	Mateusz Mikos; Poland

== Results ==
=== Final ===
16 July

Rank	Name	Nationality	Attempts						Result	Notes
Rank	Name	Nationality	1	2	3	4	5	6	Result	Notes
1st place, gold medalist(s)	Valeriy Kokoyev	Russia	18.01	18.34	18.60	20.20	19.14	19.60	20.20	
2nd place, silver medalist(s)	Nick Petersen	Denmark	18.01	18.88	18.24	18.79	x	18.94	18.94	
3rd place, bronze medalist(s)	Mateusz Mikos	Poland	17.55	18.38	18.35	18.66	18.65	18.89	18.89	
4	Tobias Hepperle	Germany	18.31	x	18.39	18.33	18.16	18.52	18.52	
5	Yeoryios Yeromarkakis	Greece	18.05	17.75	17.70	17.76	17.84	18.40	18.40	
6	Vladislav Tuláček	Czech Republic	17.59	18.03	x	x	x	x	18.03	
7	Markus Bandekow	Germany	17.89	x	16.92	17.97	17.90	18.00	18.00	
8	Paulius Luožys	Lithuania	16.93	x	17.87	x	x	x	17.87	
9	Siarhei Bakhar	Belarus	16.73	x	17.50				17.50	
10	Łukasz Haratyk	Poland	17.28	x	17.05				17.28	
11	Tumatai Dauphin	France	16.79	16.96	x				16.96	
12	Maarten Persoon	Netherlands	x	16.42	x				16.42	

=== Qualifications ===
16 July
Qualifying 18.25 or 12 best to the Final

==== Group A ====
Rank	Name	Nationality	Result	Notes
1	Tobias Hepperle	Germany	18.60	Q
2	Nick Petersen	Denmark	18.56	Q
3	Vladislav Tuláček	Czech Republic	18.09	q
4	Mateusz Mikos	Poland	17.94	q
5	Tumatai Dauphin	France	17.66	q
6	Maarten Persoon	Netherlands	17.52	q
7	Nikola Kišanić	Croatia	17.28	
8	Margus Hunt	Estonia	17.25	
9	Niko Hauhia	Finland	17.10	
10	António Vital e Silva	Portugal	16.27	

==== Group B ====
Rank	Name	Nationality	Result	Notes
1	Valeriy Kokoyev	Russia	18.43	Q
2	Markus Bandekow	Germany	17.93	q
3	Yeoryios Yeromarkakis	Greece	17.73	q
4	Paulius Luožys	Lithuania	17.54	q
5	Łukasz Haratyk	Poland	17.50	q
6	Siarhei Bakhar	Belarus	17.46	q
7	Henri Pakisjärvi	Finland	16.33	
8	Igor Mišljenović	Croatia	16.88	
	Viktor Páli	Hungary	NM	

== Participation ==
According to an unofficial count, 19 athletes from 15 countries participated in the event.

- Belarus (1)
- Croatia (2)
- Czech Republic (1)
- Denmark (1)
- Estonia (1)
- Finland (2)
- France (1)
- Germany (2)
- Greece (1)
- Hungary (1)
- Lithuania (1)
- Netherlands (1)
- Poland (2)
- Portugal (1)
- Russia (1)
