= Davante Adams =

American football player (born 1992)

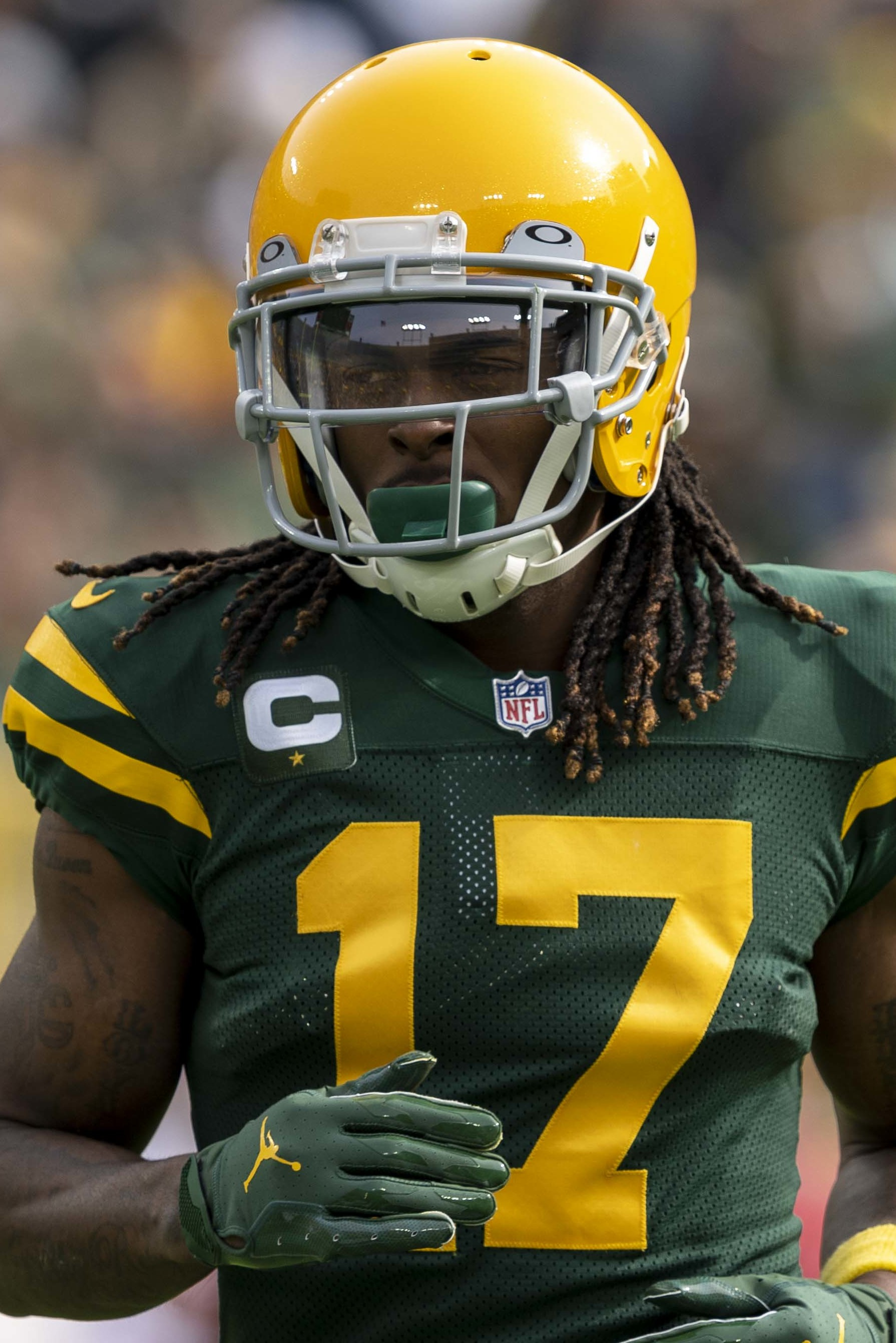
- Adams with the Green Bay Packers in 2021

No. 17 – Los Angeles Rams
- Position: Wide receiver
- Roster status: Injured reserve

Personal information
- Born: December 24, 1992 (age 33); East Palo Alto, California, U.S.
- Listed height: 6 ft 1 in (1.85 m)
- Listed weight: 204 lb (93 kg)

Career information
- High school: Palo Alto (Palo Alto, California)
- College: Fresno State (2011–2013)
- NFL draft: 2014: 2nd round, 53rd overall pick

Career history
- Green Bay Packers (2014–2021); Las Vegas Raiders (2022–2024); New York Jets (2024); Los Angeles Rams (2025–present)

Awards and highlights
- 3× First-team All-Pro (2020–2022); 6× Pro Bowl (2017–2022); 3× NFL receiving touchdowns leader (2020, 2022, 2025); Paul Warfield Trophy (2013); Second-team All-American (2013); Third-team All-American (2012); NCAA receptions leader (2013); NCAA receiving touchdowns leader (2013); MW Freshman of the Year (2012); First-team All-MW (2012, 2013); Fresno State Bulldogs No. 15 retired

Career NFL statistics as of Week 6, 2026
- Receptions: 1,047
- Receiving yards: 13,113
- Receiving touchdowns: 121
- Stats at Pro Football Reference

Davante Lavell Adams (born December 24, 1992) is an American professional football wide receiver for the Los Angeles Rams of the National Football League (NFL). He played two seasons of college football for the Fresno State Bulldogs and was named a second-team All-American in 2013 before being selected in the second round of the 2014 NFL draft by the Green Bay Packers. He is the only player in NFL history to lead the league in receiving touchdowns with three different teams.

Early in his career with the Packers, Adams was low in the wide receiver depth chart behind teammates Jordy Nelson and Randall Cobb. After being named to his first Pro Bowl in 2017, Adams signed a four-year, $58 million contract extension. For the next four seasons, Adams was the top wide receiver on the team, forming a close bond with quarterback Aaron Rodgers that culminated in leading the league in receiving touchdowns in 2020 and setting career bests in receptions and receiving yards in 2021. During his eight-year tenure with the Packers, Adams only missed 13 games, was named First-team All-Pro two times, and was selected to the Pro Bowl on five occasions.

After contract negotiations failed between the Packers and Adams during the 2022 offseason, he was traded to the Las Vegas Raiders for a first-round and second-round draft pick. Adams then signed a five-year, $141 million contract that made him the highest-paid wide receiver at the time. In his first season with the Raiders, Adams led the league in receiving touchdowns and was named to his sixth consecutive Pro Bowl. He requested a trade during the 2024 season and was dealt to the New York Jets, reuniting him with Rodgers. Adams was released following the season and later signed a two-year deal with the Rams.

== Early life ==
Davante Lavell Adams was born to Douglas Adams and Pamela Brown on December 24, 1992. He has a brother and two sisters. From East Palo Alto, California, Adams attended Palo Alto High School in neighboring Palo Alto, California. As a senior two-way starter for the Vikings football team, he led the school to a CIF state championship. He had 64 receptions for 1,094 yards and 12 touchdowns, and as a cornerback on defense he totaled 44 tackles, including two for a loss, two forced fumbles, an interception, and four passes defended. He also played basketball and was considered a two-star recruit in that sport. Lettering all four years in basketball, he averaged 9.0 points, 5.8 rebounds, and 5.4 assists as a senior. He was recruited by California State University, Fresno, University of Hawaiʻi, and San Diego State. Adams committed to play college football at Fresno State.

== College career ==
Adams attended California State University, Fresno, where he played on the Fresno State Bulldogs football team from 2011 to 2013.

In 2011, Adams redshirted as a true freshman at Fresno State in his only season with then-head coach Pat Hill.

=== 2012 season ===
In the 2012 season, Adams had a new head coach in Tim DeRuyter. He became an instant contributor in the Bulldogs' 9–4 season. In his collegiate debut, he had 118 receiving yards and two touchdowns in a win over the Weber State Wildcats on September 1, 2012. On September 29, against the San Diego State Aztecs, he had eight receptions for 102 yards. On October 6, against the Colorado State Rams, he had the first of eight consecutive games with a receiving touchdown. In the win, he had four receptions for 41 yards and two touchdowns. On October 27, a road game against the New Mexico Lobos, he had nine receptions for 198 yards and two touchdowns. On November 10, in a road game against the Nevada Wolf Pack, he had nine receptions for 120 yards and a touchdown. In the regular season finale against the Air Force Falcons, he had nine receptions for 141 yards and two touchdowns. On Christmas Eve, against the SMU Mustangs, he had 13 receptions for 144 yards and a touchdown in the 43–10 loss in the 2012 Hawaii Bowl. Overall, in the 2012 season, he had 102 receptions for 1,312 yards and 14 touchdowns. All three led the Mountain West Conference. He was the conference's Freshman of the Year, a Freshman All-American, and a third-team All-American selection by College Football News. He was also the MVP of the 2012 Hawaii Bowl.

=== 2013 season ===
Adams continued to be a very productive member of the offense in the Bulldogs' 11–2 season in 2013. He started the 2013 season with 14 receptions for 148 yards and two touchdowns in a 52–51 win over the Rutgers Scarlet Knights. On September 20, against the Boise State Broncos, he had 12 receptions for 110 yards and a touchdown in the 41–40 victory to give the Bulldogs a 3–0 record. On October 5, in a road game against the Idaho Vandals, he had 16 receptions for 185 yards and three touchdowns in the 61–14 victory. Two weeks later, against the UNLV Rebels, he had eight receptions for 221 yards and four touchdowns in the 38–14 victory. Adams scored on a 75-yard touchdown to start the game. On November 23, against the New Mexico Lobos, he had nine receptions for 246 yards and four touchdowns in the 69–28 victory to help get the Bulldogs to a 10–0 record. In the following road game against the San Jose State Spartans, he had 13 receptions for 264 yards and three touchdowns in the 62–52 loss, Fresno State's first of the season. On December 7, against the Utah State Aggies in the regular season finale, he had nine receptions for 168 yards and a touchdown in the MWC Championship Game. In his final collegiate game, the 2013 Las Vegas Bowl against the USC Trojans, he had nine receptions for 74 yards and a touchdown. Overall, in the 2013 season, he led the nation with 131 receptions for 1,719 yards and 24 touchdowns. He set a Mountain West Conference record with his 24 touchdown receptions, eight more than any player in the country in 2013, and the total ranks fourth in single-season FBS history. He also set Fresno State career records for receptions (233) and touchdown receptions (38) despite playing just two seasons for the Bulldogs. He was named second-team All-America by the Associated Press and Walter Camp Football Foundation.

On December 27, 2013, Adams announced that he would forgo his final two college seasons and enter the 2014 NFL draft.

== Professional career ==
External videos
- Adams' NFL Combine workout
- Adams gets drafted by Green Bay

Pre-draft measurables
Height	Weight	Arm length	Hand span	Wingspan	40-yard dash	10-yard split	20-yard split	20-yard shuttle	Three-cone drill	Vertical jump	Broad jump	Bench press
6 ft 0 7/8 in (1.85 m)	212 lb (96 kg)	32 5/8 in (0.83 m)	9 in (0.23 m)	6 ft 5 3/4 in (1.97 m)	4.51 s	1.60 s	2.59 s	4.30 s	6.82 s	39.5 in (1.00 m)	10 ft 7 in (3.23 m)	14 reps
All values are from NFL Combine/Pro Day

=== Green Bay Packers ===
==== 2014–2017 ====
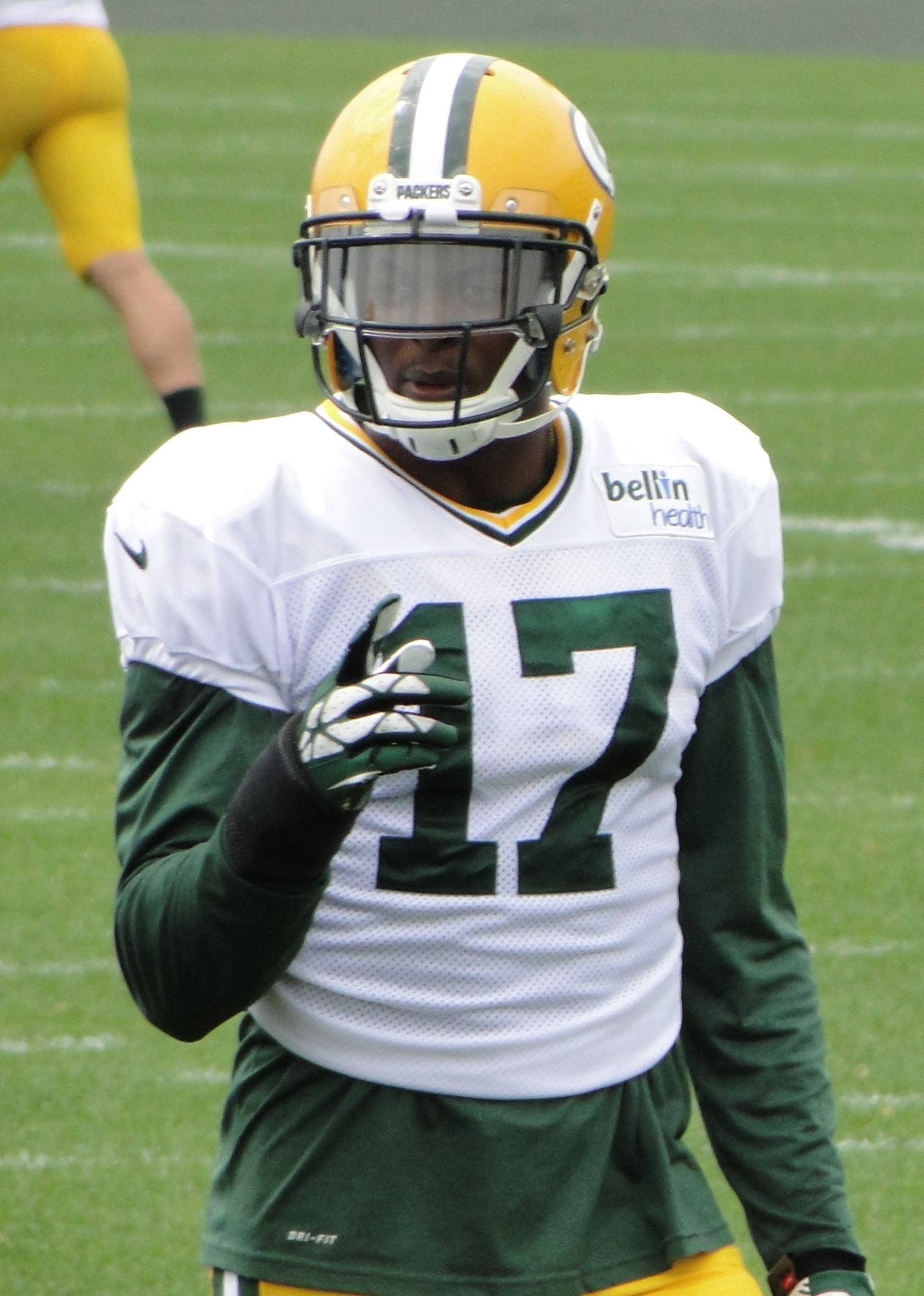
Adams with the Packers in 2014

Adams was selected in the second round with the 53rd overall pick by the Green Bay Packers in the 2014 NFL draft. He was the ninth wide receiver to be selected that year. On June 12, 2014, he signed a contract with the Packers.

After playing in the number four receiver slot in his NFL debut in the 2014 season against the Seattle Seahawks, Adams took 37 snaps in the second game against the New York Jets, where he had 5 catches for 50 yards. Entrenched as the Packers' number three receiver, on October 2, Adams scored his first NFL touchdown on an 11-yard pass from Aaron Rodgers in a 42–10 victory over the Minnesota Vikings. The score was Rodgers' 200th career touchdown pass. On October 26, Adams had a personal-best 7 receptions in a loss to the New Orleans Saints. He tallied his first 100-yard receiving game on November 30 with six receptions for 121 yards in a 26–21 win over the New England Patriots. Though a distant third to Jordy Nelson and Randall Cobb, Adams' 446 receiving yards and 3 touchdowns were a solid rookie contribution to the 12–4 Packers. In the divisional round, Adams set the Packers' rookie record for receiving yards in a playoff game with 117 in the victory over the Dallas Cowboys, including a 46-yard touchdown. In the NFC Championship Game against the Seattle Seahawks, he was held to one reception for seven yards in the 28–22 overtime loss.

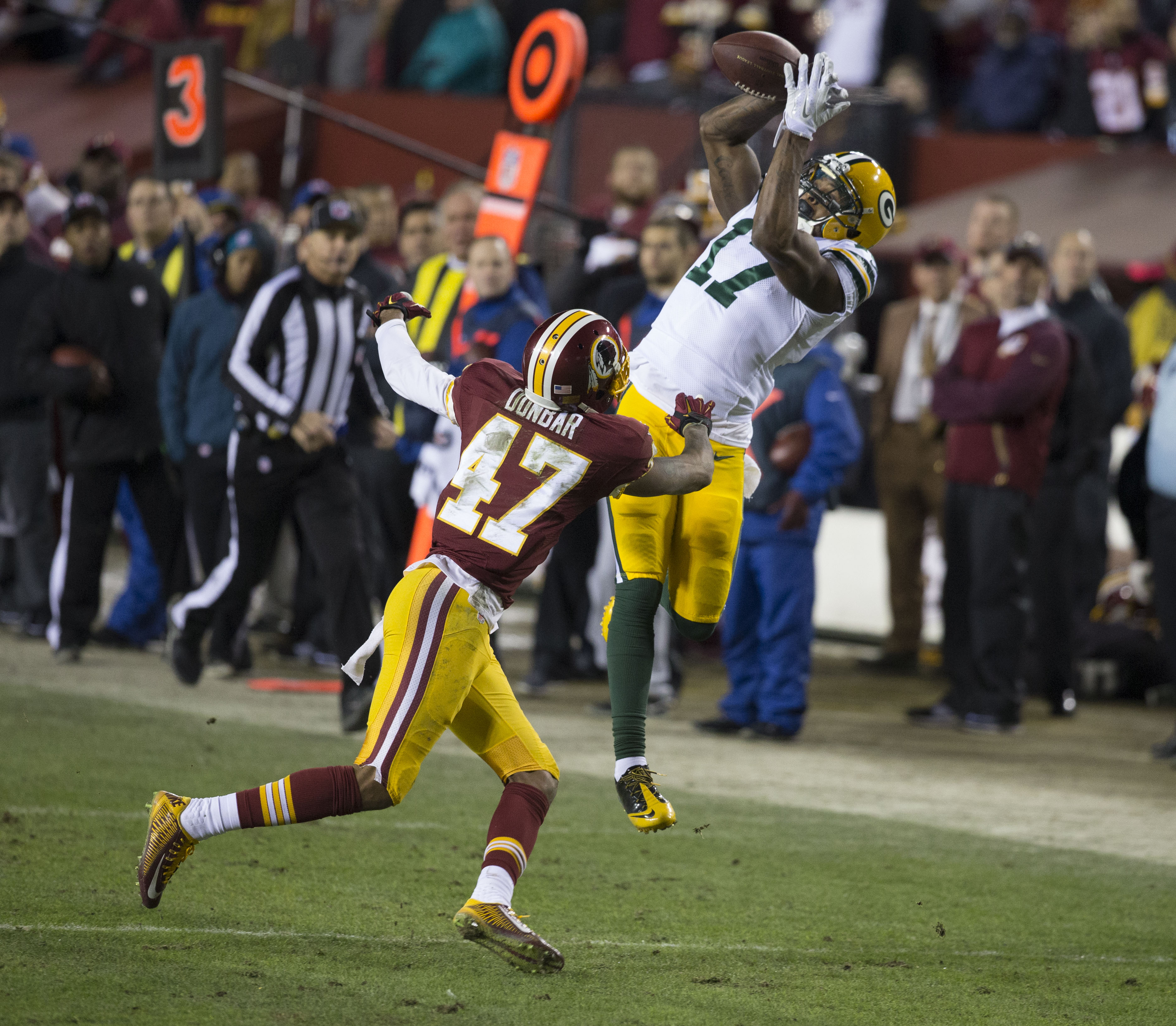
Adams catching a pass over Washington Redskins cornerback Quinton Dunbar during the Packers-Redskins playoff game in 2016

Adams started the 2015 season with four receptions for 59 yards in a 31–23 victory over the Chicago Bears. Adams missed three games after an ankle injury in Week 2. On November 8, against the Carolina Panthers, he had seven receptions for a season-high 93 yards. In the following game, he had a season-high 10 receptions for 79 yards in the loss to the Detroit Lions. On December 3, in the second divisional game against the Lions, he had his only touchdown of the season in the 27–23 victory. His second season was a "dud", finishing fourth on the team in receptions (50) and receiving yards (483), with 1 touchdown, all for a team without star Jordy Nelson. However, his efforts preparing for 2016 earned him the unofficial "off-season MVP" award.

His work-ethic paid off, as Adams recorded five touchdowns through his first six games in the 2016 season. On October 26, Adams was named NFC Offensive Player of the Week after catching 13 passes for 132 yards and two touchdowns against the Bears in Week 7. He topped this total with a Packers' season-best 156 yards in a 47–25 road loss against the Tennessee Titans. On November 28, against the Philadelphia Eagles, he had 113 yards and two touchdowns in the 27–13 victory. Adams finished as the Packers' second-leading receiver with 997 yards on 75 catches for 12 touchdowns (as well as second in the NFL only to teammate Jordy Nelson). Adams began the post-season with eight receptions including a touchdown, and the 13th-most post-season receiving yards in Packers history with 125 in a win over the New York Giants. He added 76 yards in the division win over the Cowboys, and a touchdown in the NFC Championship loss to the Atlanta Falcons.

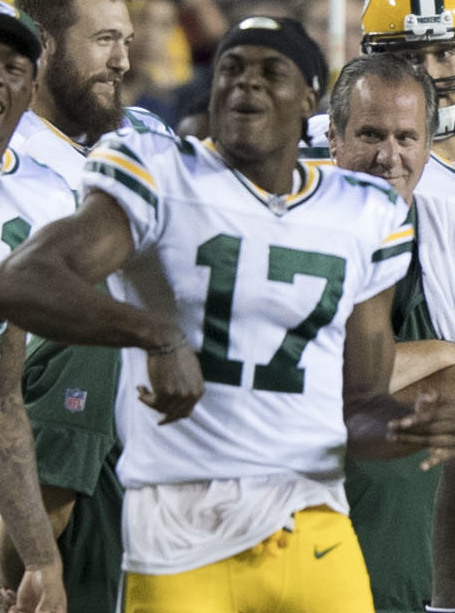
Adams in 2017

Adams began the 2017 season with three receptions for 47 yards in a 17–9 home victory over the Seahawks. In Week 2, in a 34–23 loss to the Falcons, Adams had eight receptions for 99 yards, which included a 33-yard touchdown. In the Week 4 game against the Bears, Adams had to be taken to a hospital in an ambulance after a strong helmet-to-helmet hit by Chicago linebacker Danny Trevathan, who earned a 2-game suspension (later reduced to one game). The next week, he returned to record 7 receptions for 66 yards and 2 touchdowns, including the game-winner with 11 seconds left against the Cowboys. Early in Week 6, starter Aaron Rodgers suffered a broken clavicle against the Minnesota Vikings, and would not return for nine weeks. With inexperienced back-up quarterback Brett Hundley, Adams averaged five receptions for 40 yards in three straight losses, before recording 90 yards on five receptions and the eventual game-winning touchdown in a Week 10 win over the Bears. He also went for 126 yards on eight receptions against the Baltimore Ravens in Week 11, as well as 82 yards, including a season-long 55-yard touchdown, in a 31–28 road loss to the Pittsburgh Steelers in Week 12. After catching only four passes for 42 yards in Week 13 against the Tampa Bay Buccaneers, Adams had his first 10-reception game of the season for another 82 yards, including the game-tying touchdown with 17 seconds left, and a 25-yard walk-off touchdown in overtime, to defeat the Cleveland Browns. At that point, he was tied for second in the NFL with 9 receiving touchdowns. In Week 15, Adams suffered another concussion following a helmet-to-helmet hit from Panthers linebacker Thomas Davis. Due to the concussion, Adams missed the final two games of the season. He finished the season starting in 14 games, and was first on the team with 74 catches for 885 yards and 10 touchdowns. He was named to his first Pro Bowl and was ranked 45th by his peers on the NFL Top 100 Players of 2018.

On December 29, 2017, Adams signed a four-year, $58 million contract extension with the Packers.

==== 2018–2022 ====
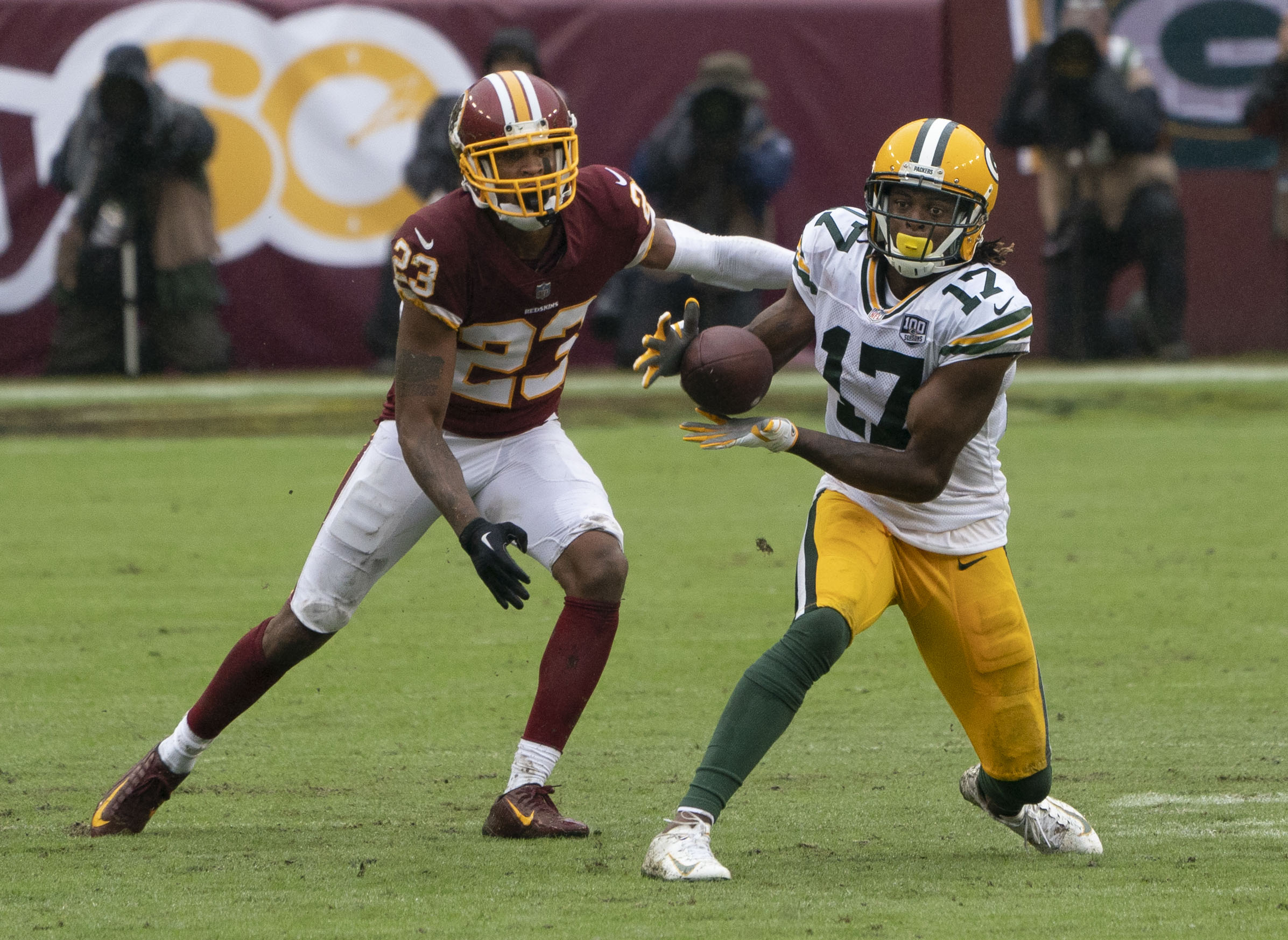
Adams against Redskins cornerback Quinton Dunbar in 2018

With the return of Aaron Rodgers from injury, Adams had a touchdown reception in each of the Packers' first three games of the 2018 season, while averaging 6.7 receptions for 68 yards. En route to eight receptions for 81 yards in Week 4, Adams suffered a calf injury but continued to play due to more severe injuries to teammates Randall Cobb and Geronimo Allison. In Week 5, Adams had nine receptions for 140 yards and a touchdown in a 31–23 loss to the Lions. In a Week 6 Monday Night Football win over the San Francisco 49ers, Adams recorded 10 receptions for 132 yards and two touchdowns, including a 38-yard reception, a 16-yard game-tying touchdown, and two catches for 27 yards to set up the go-ahead field goal, all of which happened in the final three minutes. After a Week 7 bye, Adams had his third consecutive 100-yard game with five receptions for 133 yards in a narrow 29–27 road loss to the Los Angeles Rams. After being limited in yards but recording three touchdowns in his next two games, Adams had a career-best 166 yards on 10 receptions in a Week 11 loss to the Seahawks. A week later, in a 24–17 loss to the Vikings, Adams had five receptions for 69 yards and a touchdown. His performance contributed to reaching 1,000 receiving yards in a season for the first time in his career. Adams also scored his tenth touchdown of the season, which gave him his third consecutive season of double-digit receiving touchdowns. He had a touchdown in each of the next two games as well. In Week 15 against the Bears, Adams had eight catches for 119 yards in a 24–17 loss, putting him over 100 receptions in a season for the first time in his career. In Week 16 against the Jets, with the Packers eliminated from the playoffs, Adams had 11 receptions for 71 yards and caught the game-winning touchdown in overtime. Rather than risk worsening a nagging knee injury, Adams sat out the final week of the season, finishing with one reception (111 total) and 133 yards (1,386 total) short of the franchise season receiving records. He was named to his second Pro Bowl, and was ranked 35th by his fellow players on the NFL Top 100 Players of 2019.

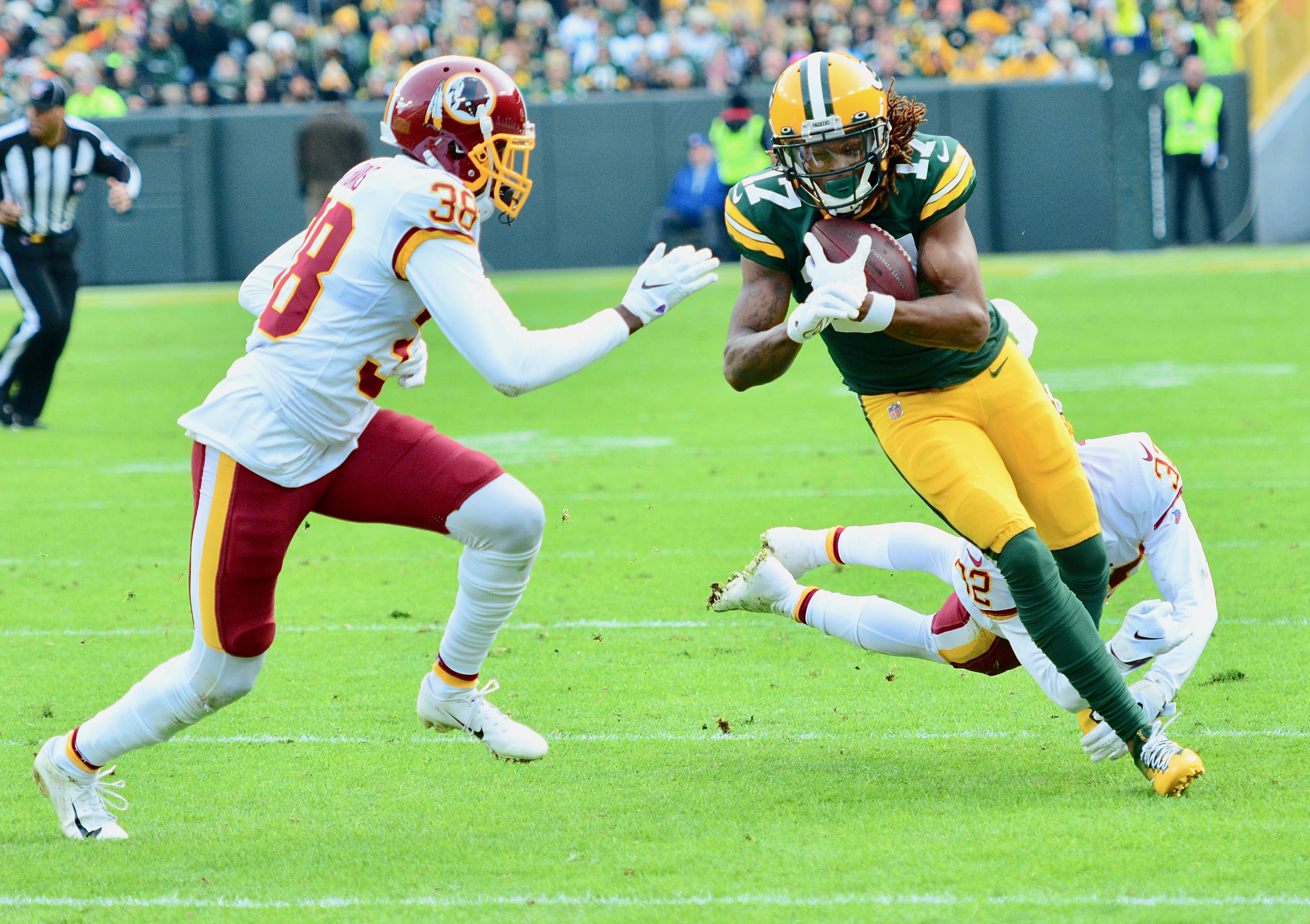
Adams (right) in 2019

During Week 2 of the 2019 season against the Vikings, Adams caught seven passes for 106 yards as the Packers won 21–16. Two weeks later against the Eagles, Adams recorded a career-high 180 yards receiving on 10 receptions, before exiting the game with 10 minutes left in the fourth quarter with a turf toe injury. The Packers went on to lose 34–27. Adams missed the next four games; he returned to the field during a Week 9 road loss of 26–11 to the Los Angeles Chargers, finishing with seven receptions for 41 yards. In the next game against the Panthers, Adams caught seven passes for 118 yards in the 24–16 victory. After a Week 11 bye, the Packers went on the road to face the 49ers. In that game, Adams caught seven passes for 43 yards, along with his first touchdown of the season and a two-point conversion, accounting for all of the Packers' points in the 37–8 loss. During Week 13 against the Giants, Adams caught six passes for 64 yards and two touchdowns in the 31–13 road victory. Two weeks later against the Bears, he caught seven passes for 103 yards and a touchdown during the 21–13 win. In the next game against the Vikings on Monday Night Football, Adams caught 13 passes for 116 yards in a 23–10 road victory. He finished the season with 83 receptions for 997 receiving yards and five receiving touchdowns. He was named to his third consecutive Pro Bowl. In the Divisional Round against the Seahawks, Adams caught eight passes for a postseason-franchise record 160 yards and two touchdowns during the 28–23 victory. In the NFC Championship against the 49ers, he had nine receptions for 138 yards in the 37–20 road loss. In the process, Adams became the only Packer with two games of 100+ receiving yards in a single postseason game coupled with three career postseason games for 125+ receiving yards. He was ranked 57th by his fellow players on the NFL Top 100 Players of 2020.

During Week 1 of the 2020 season against the Vikings, Adams finished with 156 receiving yards and two receiving touchdowns on 14 receptions (tying Don Hutson's franchise record) as the Packers won 43–34. During Week 7 against the Houston Texans, Adams finished with 13 catches for 196 receiving yards and two touchdowns as the Packers won 35–20. In Week 8 against the Vikings, he had seven receptions for 53 receiving yards and three receiving touchdowns in the 28–22 loss. In Week 9 against the 49ers on Thursday Night Football, he had ten receptions for 173 receiving yards and a touchdown in the 34–17 victory. In Week 11 against the Indianapolis Colts, Adams recorded seven catches for 106 yards and a touchdown during the 34–31 overtime loss. In Week 12 against the Bears, Adams recorded his 500th career catch on a 12-yard touchdown pass from Aaron Rodgers, becoming the fifth receiver in Packers history to reach that mark. In Week 13 against the Eagles, Adams recorded ten catches for 121 yards and two touchdowns during the 30–16 win. Adams' second touchdown reception was the 400th career touchdown pass thrown by Aaron Rodgers. In Week 14 against the Lions, Adams recorded seven catches for 115 yards and a touchdown during the 31–24 win. On December 21, 2020, he was selected for the 2021 Pro Bowl. Despite heavy snowfall, Adams caught 11 passes for 142 yards and three touchdowns in a 40–14 rout of the Titans on Sunday Night Football in Week 16. The outing helped the Adams-Rodgers connection set the new Packers team record of 492 completions which took seven seasons. Overall, he finished the 2020 season with 115 receptions for 1,374 receiving yards and 18 receiving touchdowns. Adams had a historic season in 2020: he led the league in with 18 receiving touchdowns, the most since Randy Moss had 23 in 2007, and tying Sterling Sharpe's single-season franchise record (1994). His 115 receptions also set a franchise best, usurping Sharpe's 1993 season. On January 8, 2021, he made the 2020 All-Pro Team first-team. In the Divisional Round of the playoffs against the Rams, Adams recorded nine catches for 66 yards and a touchdown during the 32–18 win. In the NFC Championship against the Buccaneers, Adams recorded nine catches for 67 yards and a touchdown during the 31–26 loss. He was ranked sixth by his fellow players on the NFL Top 100 Players of 2021.

In the first month on the 2021 season, Adams had a 121-yard game against the Lions in Week 2 and a 12-catch, 132-yard game against the 49ers in Week 3. In Week 5 against the Cincinnati Bengals, Adams secured a career-high 206 yards on 11 receptions alongside a touchdown in the 25–22 overtime win. In Week 11 against the Vikings, Adams caught seven passes for 115 yards and two touchdowns in the 31–34 loss. In Week 13 against the Bears, Adams caught ten passes for 121 yards and two touchdowns in the 45–30 win. On December 23, 2021, Adams was named to his fifth consecutive Pro Bowl. He broke his own single-season franchise record for receptions the following week with an 11 reception, 136-yard, one touchdown performance in a 37–10 victory over the Minnesota Vikings. He then broke the Packers' single season receiving yards record the following week, ending with 1,553 yards in a season. For the fifth consecutive season, he was named to the Pro Bowl. He was selected to the 2021 All-Pro Team for the second consecutive season. In the Divisional Round against the San Francisco 49ers, he had nine receptions for 90 yards in the 13–10 loss. He was ranked seventh by his fellow players on the NFL Top 100 Players of 2022.

On March 8, 2022, the Packers placed a franchise tag on Adams. On March 14, Adams informed the Packers that he would not play under the franchise tag for the 2022 season.

=== Las Vegas Raiders ===
On March 18, 2022, the Packers traded Adams to the Las Vegas Raiders in exchange for their 2022 first-round pick (later used to select Quay Walker) and second-round pick. Along with the trade, Adams signed a five-year, $141.25M deal, making him the highest-paid wide receiver in the NFL at the time of the signing. The trade also reunited Adams with his college quarterback Derek Carr, with whom he played at Fresno State from 2012 to 2013.

Adams made his Raiders debut in Week 1 of the 2022 season against the Chargers, where he caught 10 passes for 141 yards and a touchdown in the 19–24 loss. Adams's first win with the Raiders came in Week 4 with a 32–23 victory over the Denver Broncos in a game where Adams had nine receptions for 101 yards. In Week 5, against the Kansas City Chiefs, Adams had three receptions for 124 yards and two touchdowns in the 30–29 loss. After the game, he shoved cameraman Ryan Zebley to the ground while walking towards the tunnel to exit the field. Adams later apologized to Zebley and said that frustration over the way the game had ended caused him to react rashly. Zebley was hospitalized for his injuries and pressed charges through the Kansas City Police Department. Adams was later charged with misdemeanor assault. On December 21, 2022, Adams was named to his sixth consecutive Pro Bowl. He earned first team All-Pro honors for the third time. He finished the season with 100 receptions, 1,516 receiving yards and a league leading 14 touchdowns. His yardage set the Raiders franchise record for most receiving yards in a season. He was ranked 13th by his fellow players on the NFL Top 100 Players of 2023.

In Week 3 of the 2023 season, Adams had 13 receptions for 172 yards and two touchdowns in a loss to the Steelers. In Week 4, Adams recorded 10,000 receiving yards for his career. In Week 17 against the Colts, he had 13 receptions for 126 yards and two touchdowns in the loss. In the 2023 season, Adams started in all 17 games. He finished the 2023 season with 103 receptions for 1,144 receiving yards and eight receiving touchdowns.

In Week 2 of the 2024 season, Adams caught nine passes for 110 yards and a touchdown in a win over the Ravens. On September 26, three days before their Week 4 game against the Browns, Adams injured his hamstring during practice. The Raiders subsequently ruled him out for Week 4 and the next two games, marking his first missed games since the 2021 season. During this time, reports surfaced that Adams had requested a trade from the Raiders.

=== New York Jets ===
On October 15, 2024, the Raiders traded Adams to the New York Jets in exchange for a 2025 conditional mid-round draft selection that if Adams were to be named to the 2024 All-Pro Team as either a first or second-team All-Pro, or the Jets advanced to the AFC Championship Game or Super Bowl LIX with Adams on their active roster, would have been a second round selection. However, neither condition was met, so the Raiders ultimately received the Lions' 2025 third-round selection instead (which was later traded to the Seattle Seahawks for Geno Smith). The trade reunited Adams with Aaron Rodgers, whom he played with from 2014 to 2021 with the Green Bay Packers.

With Adams healthy, he made his Jet debut on October 20 against the Pittsburgh Steelers, catching three passes for 30 yards in the first half, but he and the Jets were shut out in the second half as they lost 37–15. In Week 9 against the Houston Texans, Adams briefly left the game to be evaluated for a head injury. He returned in the fourth quarter and caught a 37-yard touchdown pass to seal the Jets' 21–13 victory. After being blanked in the first half of the Jets' Week 15 matchup against the Jacksonville Jaguars, Adams erupted for 198 yards and two touchdowns on nine receptions in the second half, highlighted by a career-long 71-yard score as the Jets won 32–25, snapping a four-game losing streak. Adams also became the 12th receiver in NFL history to reach 100 career receiving touchdowns. He finished the 2024 season with 85 receptions for 1,063 yards and eight touchdowns.

On March 4, 2025, Adams was released by the Jets.

=== Los Angeles Rams ===
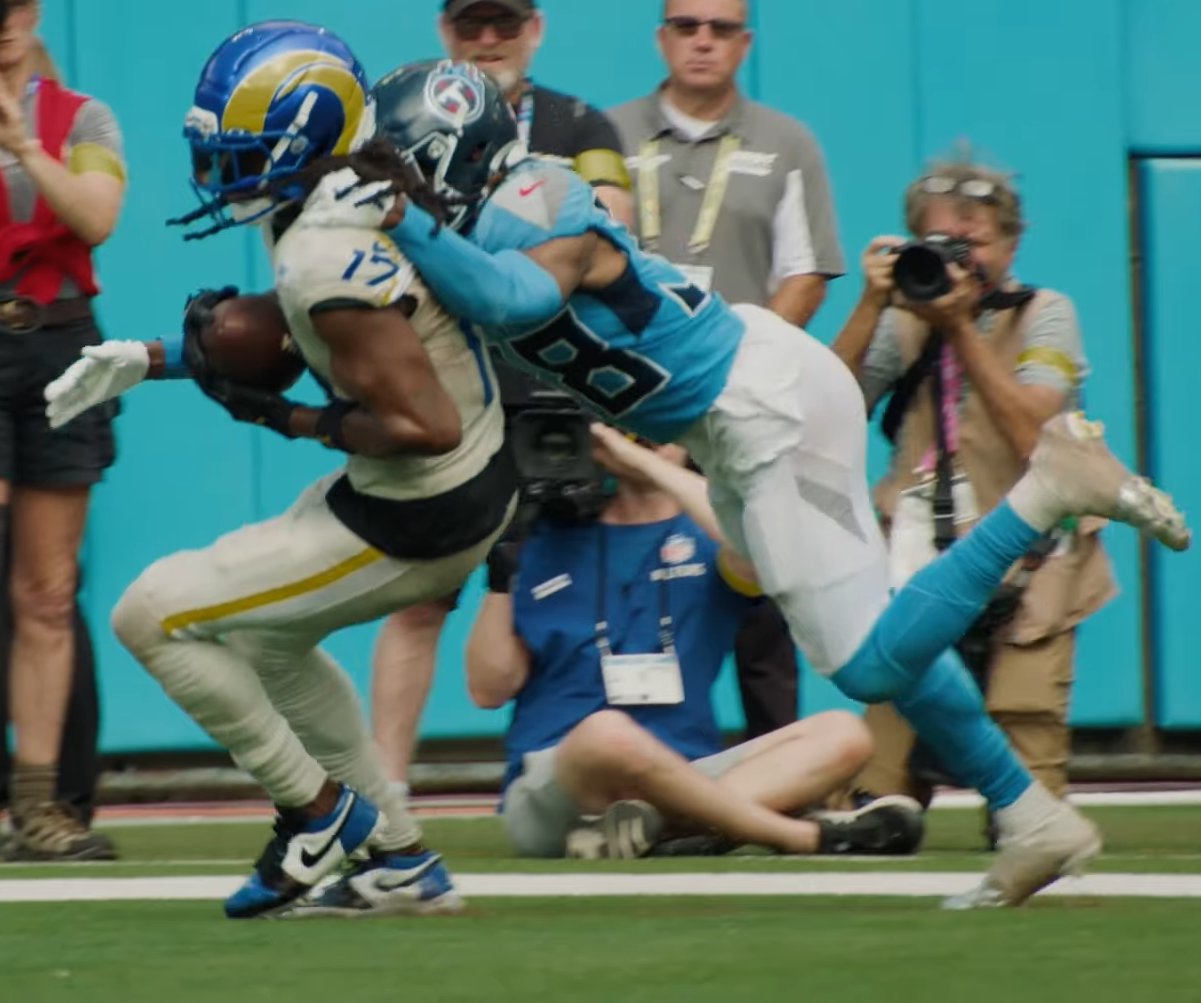
Adams playing for the Los Angeles Rams in 2025

On March 9, 2025, Adams agreed to a two-year, $44 million deal with the Los Angeles Rams. In his second game for Los Angeles, Adams caught a season-high six passes for 106 yards, including a 16-yard touchdown reception in the Rams' 33–19 win over the Tennessee Titans. In Week 8 against Jacksonville in London, Adams had five receptions for 35 yards, three of which went for touchdowns as the Rams won in a 35–7 rout. Adams was held to just a single catch in the Rams' 21–19 victory over Seattle, but it was good for a 1-yard touchdown and was the 1,000th regular season reception of Adams' career (the 17th NFL receiver to do so). In a 41–34 win over Detroit in Week 15, Adams aggravated an injury to his left hamstring and ultimately was held out for the remainder of the regular season. Despite missing the Rams' final three games, he finished the regular season with 60 receptions for 789 yards and an NFL-high 14 receiving touchdowns. He is the first player in league history to lead the NFL in touchdown receptions with three different teams (Packers in 2020, Raiders in 2022, Rams in 2025). On January 10, 2026, Adams had five receptions for 72 yards in the Rams' 34–31 win over Carolina Panthers in an NFC Wild Card Round game. Adams was held to just two 12-yard receptions in an NFC Divisional Round game against the Chicago Bears, but one helped set up a fourth quarter touchdown and the other came on a game-winning field goal drive in the Rams' 20–17 overtime victory. In the NFC Championship Game rematch against Seattle, Adams had four receptions for 89 yards, including a 2-yard touchdown pass in the third quarter of the Rams' 31–27 loss to the Seahawks. It was the fifth loss of his career in an NFC title match (having lost four times previously while playing in Green Bay), and an emotional Adams had difficulty putting into words his disappointment in postgame comments to the media. “It’s tough. It’s a tough moment we’re in right now. So, process the emotions of this and then worry about that. Obviously, I love this team, love what this team is about and love the fight that we had all year. It just sucks to come up short.”

== Career statistics ==
Legend
	Led the league
**Bold**	Career high

=== NFL ===
==== Regular season ====
Year	Team	Games		Receiving							Fumbles	
Year	Team	GP	GS	Tgt	Rec	Yds	Avg	Lng	TD	FD	Fum	Lost
2014	GB	16	11	66	38	446	11.7	45	3	23	0	0
2015	GB	13	12	94	50	483	9.7	40	1	20	0	0
2016	GB	16	15	121	75	997	13.3	66	12	46	**2**	**1**
2017	GB	14	14	117	74	885	12.0	55	10	46	0	0
2018	GB	15	15	169	111	1,386	12.5	57	13	64	0	0
2019	GB	12	12	127	83	997	12.0	58	5	54	**2**	**1**
2020	GB	14	14	149	115	1,374	11.9	56	**18**	73	1	**1**
2021	GB	16	16	169	**123**	**1,553**	12.6	59	11	**84**	0	0
2022	LV	17	17	**180**	100	1,516	**15.2**	60	14	65	1	0
2023	LV	17	17	175	103	1,144	11.1	46	8	59	0	0
2024	LV	3	3	27	18	209	11.6	30	1	10	0	0
2024	NYJ	11	11	114	67	854	12.7	**71**	7	39	0	0
2025	LAR	14	14	114	60	789	13.2	44	14	51	0	0
2026	LAR	6	5	49	30	480	16.0	64	4	21	0	0
Career		184	176	1,671	1,047	13,113	12.5	71	121	660	6	3

==== Postseason ====
Year	Team	Games		Receiving							Fumbles	
Year	Team	GP	GS	Tgt	Rec	Yds	Avg	Lng	TD	FD	Fum	Lost
2014	GB	2	2	14	8	124	15.5	46	1	5	0	0
2015	GB	1	0	4	4	48	12.0	20	1	2	0	0
2016	GB	3	3	**25**	16	217	13.6	32	**2**	12	0	0
2019	GB	2	2	22	17	**298**	**17.5**	**65**	**2**	13	0	0
2020	GB	2	2	**25**	**18**	133	7.4	21	**2**	9	0	0
2021	GB	1	1	11	9	90	10.0	25	0	5	0	0
2025	LAR	3	2	**25**	11	185	16.8	35	1	10	0	0
Total		14	12	126	83	1,095	13.2	65	9	56	0	0

=== College ===
Legend
Led the NCAA

Season	Team	Games		Receiving				
Season	Team	GP	GS	Rec	Yds	Avg	Lng	TD
2011	Fresno State	Redshirt						
2012	Fresno State	13	13	102	1,312	12.9	**89**	14
2013	Fresno State	13	13	**131**	**1,719**	**13.1**	75	**24**
Career		26	26	233	3,031	13.0	89	38

== Personal life ==
Adams married Devanne Villarreal on June 2, 2018.

In 2024, Adams starred in the Netflix original series Receiver, alongside Justin Jefferson, Amon-Ra St. Brown, George Kittle, and Deebo Samuel. The show covered Adams and the other players during the 2023 NFL season.

== See also ==
- List of National Football League annual receiving touchdowns leaders
- List of National Football League career receiving touchdowns leaders
- List of National Football League career receiving yards leaders
- List of National Football League career receptions leaders
- List of NCAA major college football yearly receiving leaders
