= 2006 World Junior Championships in Athletics – Men's shot put =

The men's shot put event at the 2006 World Junior Championships in Athletics was held in Beijing, China, at Chaoyang Sports Centre on 18 and 19 August. A 6 kg (junior implement) shot was used.

== Medalists ==
Gold	Margus Hunt; Estonia
Silver	Mostafa El-Moaty; Egypt
Bronze	Guo Yanxiang; China

== Results ==
=== Final ===
19 August

Rank	Name	Nationality	Attempts						Result	Notes
Rank	Name	Nationality	1	2	3	4	5	6	Result	Notes
1st place, gold medalist(s)	Margus Hunt	Estonia	x	19.68	x	20.17	20.53	x	20.53	
2nd place, silver medalist(s)	Mostafa El-Moaty	Egypt	20.05	20.14	x	20.06	19.97	20.08	20.14	
3rd place, bronze medalist(s)	Guo Yanxiang	China	19.02	19.76	19.97	19.21	19.38	x	19.97	
4	John Hickey	United States	x	19.86	18.04	x	x	x	19.86	
5	Meshari Mohammad	Kuwait	19.78	19.60	19.79	x	x	x	19.79	
6	Carlos Véliz	Cuba	18.59	18.45	18.84	x	19.76	19.61	19.76	
7	Saurabh Vij	India	19.75	19.58	x	19.33	x	18.99	19.75	
8	Paulius Luožys	Lithuania	19.24	19.05	x	18.60	18.80	18.73	19.24	
9	Jan Hoffman	South Africa	18.63	x	18.39				18.63	
10	Tobias Hepperle	Germany	x	18.24	18.00				18.24	
11	Joe Stevens	Australia	18.21	x	17.35				18.21	
12	Rosen Karamfilov	Bulgaria	18.16	x	17.84				18.16	

=== Qualifications ===
18 August

==== Group A ====
Rank	Name	Nationality	Attempts			Result	Notes
Rank	Name	Nationality	1	2	3	Result	Notes
1	John Hickey	United States	x	x	19.49	19.49	Q
2	Meshari Mohammad	Kuwait	19.31	-	-	19.31	Q
3	Carlos Véliz	Cuba	18.66	19.25	-	19.25	Q
4	Mostafa El-Moaty	Egypt	18.41	18.97	-	18.97	Q
5	Wang Guangpu	China	17.72	17.70	18.49	18.49	
6	Om Prakash Singh	India	x	18.13	18.41	18.41	
7	Mihai Grasu	Romania	18.29	18.06	x	18.29	
8	Ivan Semenov	Russia	17.13	18.24	x	18.24	
9	Vladislav Tulácek	Czech Republic	18.13	18.20	x	18.20	
10	Emanuele Fuamatu	Australia	17.92	17.97	17.80	17.97	
11	Stanislav Seheda	Ukraine	16.42	x	17.94	17.94	
12	Nikola Kišanic	Croatia	17.85	17.35	x	17.85	
13	Viktor Páli	Hungary	17.12	x	16.60	17.12	
14	Nick Petersen	Denmark	15.49	x	16.89	16.89	
	Maicol Spallanzani	Italy	x	x	x	NM	
	Nico Grobler	South Africa	x	x	x	NM	

==== Group B ====
Rank	Name	Nationality	Attempts			Result	Notes
Rank	Name	Nationality	1	2	3	Result	Notes
1	Saurabh Vij	India	19.27	-	-	19.27	Q
2	Paulius Luožys	Lithuania	19.08	-	-	19.08	Q
3	Jan Hoffman	South Africa	16.71	19.00	-	19.00	Q
4	Margus Hunt	Estonia	18.40	18.95	-	18.95	Q
5	Rosen Karamfilov	Bulgaria	18.62	x	18.37	18.62	q
6	Guo Yanxiang	China	x	18.12	18.62	18.62	q
7	Joe Stevens	Australia	18.37	18.61	18.18	18.61	q
8	Tobias Hepperle	Germany	18.59	18.27	18.21	18.59	q
9	António Silva	Portugal	x	18.55	x	18.55	
10	Yeóryios Yeromarkákis	Greece	17.40	17.74	18.38	18.38	
11	Konstantin Lyadusov	Russia	17.49	18.37	17.97	18.37	
12	Grigoriy Kamulya	Uzbekistan	18.01	x	18.06	18.06	
13	Eric Werskey	United States	x	x	16.62	16.62	
14	Marin Premeru	Croatia	16.54	x	x	16.54	
15	Tyron Benjamin	Dominica	15.56	16.34	16.25	16.34	

== Participation ==
According to an unofficial count, 31 athletes from 24 countries participated in the event.

- Australia (2)
- Bulgaria (1)
- China (2)
- Croatia (2)
- Cuba (1)
- Czech Republic (1)
- Denmark (1)
- Dominica (1)
- Egypt (1)
- Estonia (1)
- Germany (1)
- Greece (1)
- Hungary (1)
- India (2)
- Italy (1)
- Kuwait (1)
- Lithuania (1)
- Portugal (1)
- Romania (1)
- Russia (2)
- South Africa (2)
- Ukraine (1)
- United States (2)
- Uzbekistan (1)
