= Margus Hunt =

Estonian track and field athlete, American football player (born 1987)

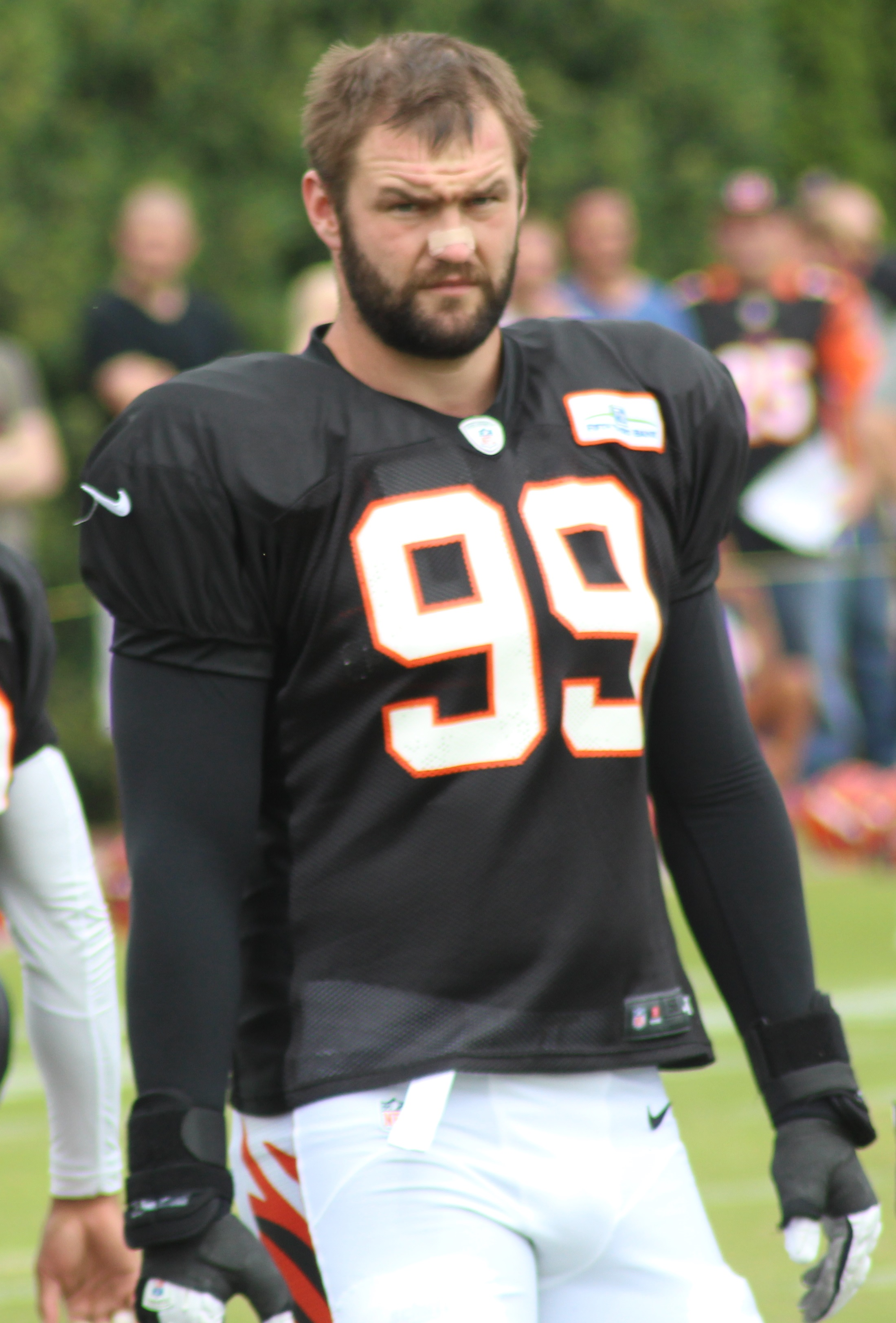
- Hunt with the Cincinnati Bengals in 2014

No. 99, 92, 70, 95, 93
- Position: Defensive end

Personal information
- Born: 14 July 1987 (age 39); Karksi-Nuia, then part of Estonian SSR, Soviet Union
- Listed height: 6 ft 8 in (2.03 m)
- Listed weight: 295 lb (134 kg)

Career information
- College: SMU (2009–2012)
- NFL draft: 2013: 2nd round, 53rd overall pick

Career history
- Cincinnati Bengals (2013–2016); Indianapolis Colts (2017–2019); New Orleans Saints (2020); Cincinnati Bengals (2020); Arizona Cardinals (2021)*; Chicago Bears (2021)
- * Offseason or practice squad member only

Awards and highlights
- First-team All-C-USA (2012)

Career NFL statistics
- Tackles: 128
- Sacks: 8.5
- Forced fumbles: 1
- Fumble recoveries: 2
- Pass deflections: 11
- Stats at Pro Football Reference

Margus Hunt (born 14 July 1987) is a former professional American football defensive end. He was selected by the Cincinnati Bengals in the second round of the 2013 NFL draft. He played college football at SMU. He also played for the Indianapolis Colts and New Orleans Saints.

Before taking up American football, Hunt competed in the discus throw and shot put, and was the former world junior record holder in discus throw. He stands at 6'8", or 203.2 centimeters

== Early life (track and field) ==
Hunt grew up in the small town of Karksi-Nuia and took up athletics because "there wasn’t much to do". After trying decathlon he decided to concentrate on the throwing events – discus, shot and hammer throw. Hunt started training with Aleksander Tammert, an Olympic bronze medalist in discus throw from the 2004 Summer Olympics. Hunt competed in hammer throw at the 2003 World Youth Championships and discus at the 2004 World Junior Championships, placing eighth and sixth respectively.

In 2005, he won his first title at the European Junior Championships in Kaunas, throwing 62.19 metres (Championship record) with the 1.75 kg discus.

In 2006, at the World Junior Championships in Beijing Hunt established a new world junior record of 66.35 metres with his first throw in the qualifying round. In the finals, Hunt improved his own world junior record to 66.68 m in the fourth round and then 67.32 m in the sixth and final round.

Three days later he won the gold medal in the shot put at 20.53 metres in the final, beating the closest competitor by 39 centimetres. Hunt became the first athlete to win the gold medal in both shot and discus at the World Junior Championships, outperforming Rutger Smith of the Netherlands who won a gold and a bronze in 2000. His winning distance of 20.53 m was a national junior record with the 6 kg shot.

His personal best hammer throw result is 64.89 made on 28 March 2008, in Arlington, Texas. His personal best shot put result is 17.98 made on 22 March 2008, in Waco.

His personal best with the senior 2 kg discus is 61.33 meters made on 6 July 2010, in Viljandi.

== College career ==
Hunt left Estonia for Dallas, Texas, in 2007 in order to train with Southern Methodist University track and field coach Dave Wollman, and he began attending SMU part-time. However, by the time he arrived at SMU, the university had dropped its men's track program. Hunt wanted to keep working with Wollman, who had previously worked with an Estonian discus thrower, 2004 Olympic bronze Aleksander Tammert, and Wollman decided that Hunt's size and athleticism could earn him an athletic scholarship playing for the SMU Mustangs football team. When Hunt tried out for football, his physical power, combined with a 4.7-second 40-yard dash, led Mustangs head football coach June Jones to offer him a scholarship, and he began attending SMU full-time in 2009. He then played for the Mustangs for the next four seasons. On 12 October 2009, Hunt was named the Conference USA Special Teams Player of the Week. On 7 November Hunt broke the school record for blocked kicks in a season when he blocked an extra-point try and a field goal against Rice. In his first 14 games at SMU he blocked eight kicks, putting him in the top 10 in blocked kicks among all NCAA players. He was named the MVP of the 2012 Hawaii Bowl. He almost broke the NCAA's all-time record for blocked kicks (19), but eventually finished college career with 17 blocks, the second highest in that account.

For nearly 10 years, Bruce Feldman, a writer for CBSSports.com, has annually compiled what he calls a "Freak List" of the 10 college football players he considers the most freakish athletes. In 2012, Hunt was on top of his list. According to Feldman, Hunt "sounds like a PlayStation football creation"—despite his 82-inch (2.1 m) wingspan, he is able to bench press 225 pounds (102 kg) 35 times, and has also cleaned 384 pounds (174 kg) and snatched 345 pounds (156 kg). Hunt also boasts a 36-inch (91 cm) vertical jump. Wollman predicted that Hunt would have 45 repetitions and a 4.6-second 40-yard dash at the 2013 NFL Combine. Hunt did, in fact, run a 4.60-second 40-yard dash and did 38 bench press repetitions while posting a vertical leap of 34.5-inch (88 cm) at the 2013 combine.

== Professional career ==
Pre-draft measurables
| Height | Weight | Arm length | Hand span | 40-yard dash | 10-yard split | 20-yard split | 20-yard shuttle | Three-cone drill | Vertical jump | Broad jump | Bench press |
|---|---|---|---|---|---|---|---|---|---|---|---|
| 6 ft 8 1/8 in (2.04 m) | 277 lb (126 kg) | 33 3/4 in (0.86 m) | 10 in (0.25 m) | 4.60 s | 1.63 s | 2.71 s | 4.51 s | 7.07 s | 34.5 in (0.88 m) | 10 ft 1 in (3.07 m) | 38 reps |
All values from NFL Combine.

=== Cincinnati Bengals (first stint) ===
On 26 April 2013, the Cincinnati Bengals selected Hunt in the second round, 53rd pick overall, of the 2013 NFL draft. Bengals defensive coordinator Mike Zimmer compared him to Bengals defensive end/linebacker Michael Johnson at a post-draft news conference, explaining that both players were very raw coming out of college but had the potential to be great.

On 6 October 2013, Hunt made his debut in NFL, when the Bengals beat the New England Patriots 13–6. He played in 10 games and was inactive the other six. He totaled four tackles, a shared sack and seven quarterback pressures as the Bengals won the AFC North.

Hunt totaled seven tackles and one sack in 12 games in 2014 as the Bengals went 10-5-1 and again made the playoffs.

Hunt was anticipated to have a breakout season in 2015. He did not, and totaled only 2 tackles and no sacks in 7 games for the Bengals.

=== Indianapolis Colts ===
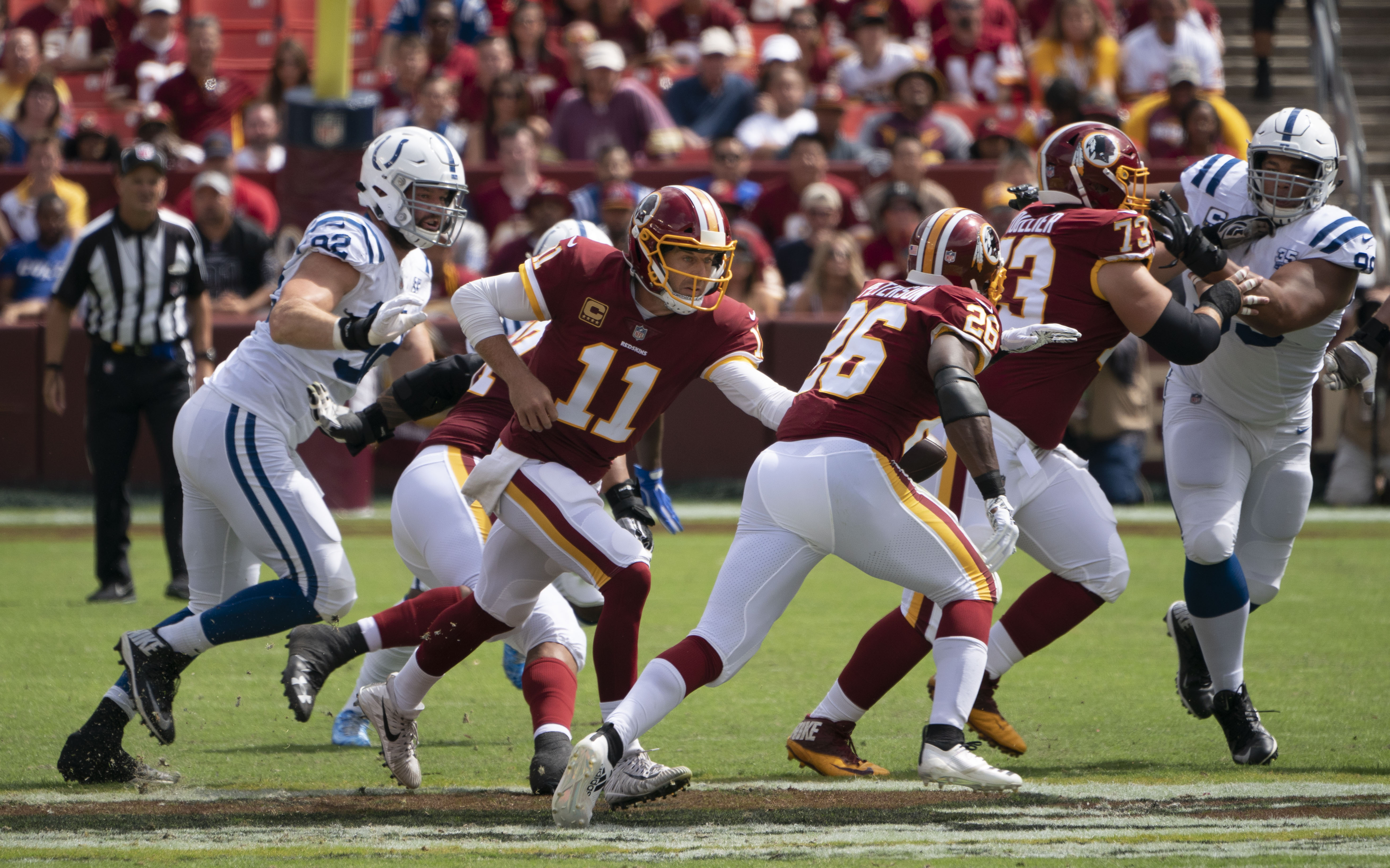
Hunt (left, #92) playing against the Washington Redskins in 2018.

On 13 March 2017, Hunt signed a two-year contract with the Indianapolis Colts. In his first season with the Colts, Hunt totaled 29 tackles and a sack.

In Week 1 of the 2018 season, Hunt had two sacks against his former team the Bengals, nearly totalling the 2.5 career sacks he had coming into the game. In Week 3 against the Philadelphia Eagles, Hunt recorded four tackles, including a sack, and recovered his own forced fumble. Through three weeks, Hunt was leading the league in tackles for a loss with eight. He started 15 games in 2018, recording 30 combined tackles and five sacks.

On 5 March 2019, Hunt signed a two-year, $9 million contract extension with the Colts.

The Colts released Hunt on 16 March 2020.

=== New Orleans Saints ===
On 1 May 2020, Hunt signed a one-year contract with the New Orleans Saints. He was released on 5 September 2020, and signed to the practice squad the next day. He was elevated to the active roster on 12 September for the team's week 1 game against the Tampa Bay Buccaneers, and reverted to the practice squad on 14 September. He was elevated again on 21 September for the week 2 game against the Las Vegas Raiders, and reverted to the practice squad again following the game. He was promoted to the active roster on 26 September 2020. On 12 October 2020, Hunt was released by the Saints.

=== Cincinnati Bengals (second stint) ===
On 19 October 2020, Hunt signed with the Bengals. He was placed on the reserve/COVID-19 list by the team on 9 November 2020, and was activated on 20 November.

=== Arizona Cardinals ===
On 11 August 2021, Hunt signed with the Arizona Cardinals. He was released on 31 August 2021.

=== Chicago Bears ===
On 8 September 2021, Hunt was signed to the Chicago Bears practice squad. Hunt was elevated from the practice squad to the active roster on 18 September 2021, for the week 2 game against the Cincinnati Bengals at Soldier Field in Chicago, as well on 25 September 2021, for the week 3 game against the Cleveland Browns in Cleveland. He was promoted to the active roster on 23 November.

=== NFL statistics ===
| Year | Team | Games | | Tackles | | | | Interceptions | | | Fumbles |
| Year | Team | G | GS | Comb | Solo | Ast | Sk | PD | Int | TD | FF |
|---|---|---|---|---|---|---|---|---|---|---|---|
| 2013 | CIN | 10 | 0 | 3 | 1 | 2 | 0.5 | 0 | 0 | 0 | 0 |
| 2014 | CIN | 12 | 0 | 7 | 5 | 2 | 1.0 | 1 | 0 | 0 | 0 |
| 2015 | CIN | 7 | 0 | 2 | 1 | 1 | 0.0 | 0 | 0 | 0 | 0 |
| 2016 | CIN | 15 | 0 | 17 | 9 | 8 | 0.0 | 2 | 0 | 0 | 0 |
| 2017 | IND | 16 | 5 | 29 | 19 | 10 | 1.0 | 2 | 0 | 0 | 0 |
| 2018 | IND | 15 | 15 | 30 | 22 | 8 | 5.0 | 2 | 0 | 0 | 1 |
| 2019 | IND | 16 | 5 | 17 | 14 | 3 | 0.0 | 0 | 0 | 0 | 0 |
| 2020 | NOR | 4 | 0 | 3 | 2 | 1 | 0.0 | 0 | 0 | 0 | 0 |
| 2020 | CIN | 9 | 1 | 6 | 5 | 1 | 1.0 | 4 | 0 | 0 | 0 |
| 2021 | CHI | 10 | 0 | 14 | 6 | 8 | 0.0 | 0 | 0 | 0 | 0 |
| Career | | 106 | 26 | 117 | 80 | 37 | 8.5 | 11 | 0 | 0 | 1 |

== Achievements (track and field) ==
| Year | Competition | Venue | Position | Event | Notes |
Representing Estonia
| 2003 | Youth World Championships | Sherbrooke, Quebec, Canada | 8th | Hammer throw (5 kg) | 64.77 PB |
| 2004 | World Junior Championships | Grosseto, Italy | 6th | Discus throw (1.75 kg) | 58.30 m PB |
| 2005 | Junior European Championships | Kaunas, Lithuania | 1st | Discus throw (1.75 kg) | 62.19 CR, NJR |
| 2006 | Junior World Championships | Beijing, China | 1st | Shot put (6 kg) | 20.53 m WJL, NJR |
| 2006 | Junior World Championships | Beijing, China | 1st | Discus throw (1.75 kg) | 67.32 m WJR |
| 2006 | European Cup First League Group A | Prague, Czech Republic | 6th | Hammer throw | 60.21 SB |
| 2007 | European U23 Championships | Debrecen, Hungary | 6th | Discus throw | 56.49 m |
| 2009 | European U23 Championships | Kaunas, Lithuania | 14th (q) | Shot put | 17.25 m |
| 2009 | European U23 Championships | Kaunas, Lithuania | 9th | Discus throw | 56.09 m |
