= Athletics at the 2011 Pan American Games – Men's shot put =

Men's shot put at the 2011 Pan American Games
- Venue: Telmex Athletics Stadium
- Dates: October 25
- Competitors: 13 from 10 nations

Medalists
Gold medal	Dylan Armstrong	Canada
Silver medal	Carlos Véliz	Cuba
Bronze medal	Germán Lauro	Argentina

The men's shot put competition of the athletics events at the 2011 Pan American Games took place on the 25 of October at the Telmex Athletics Stadium. The defending Pan American Games champion is Dylan Armstrong of Canada.

== Records ==
Prior to this competition, the existing world and Pan American Games records were as follows:

World record	Randy Barnes (USA)	23.12	Westwood, United States	May 20, 1990
Pan American Games record	Reese Hoffa (USA)	20.95	Santo Domingo, Dominican Republic	August 5, 2003

== Qualification ==
Each National Olympic Committee (NOC) was able to enter up to two entrants provided they had met the minimum standard (17.20 meters) in the qualifying period (January 1, 2010 to September 14, 2011).

== Schedule ==
Date	Time	Round
October 25, 2011	15:05	Final

== Abbreviations ==
- All distances shown are in meters:centimeters

PR	Pan American games record
WR	world record
NR	national record
PB	personal best
SB	season best
DNS	did not start

== Results ==
13 athletes from 10 countries competed.

=== Final ===
Rank	Athlete	Nationality	#1	#2	#3	#4	#5	#6	Result	Notes
1st place, gold medalist(s)	Dylan Armstrong	Canada	20.48	20.72	20.72	x	21.30	x	21.30	PR
2nd place, silver medalist(s)	Carlos Véliz	Cuba	19.99	19.91	20.09	20.59	20.76	20.42	20.76	
3rd place, bronze medalist(s)	Germán Lauro	Argentina	x	19.40	19.54	x	20.33	20.41	20.41	SB
4	Stephen Sáenz	Mexico	19.54	18.96	19.09	19.05	x	x	19.54	
5	Eder Moreno	Colombia	18.93	x	19.40	19.47	19.48	19.35	19.48	NR
6	Noah Bryant	United States	x	x	19.23	x	x	x	19.23	
7	Reynaldo Proenza	Cuba	19.06	19.00	19.04	18.80	19.05	19.19	19.19	SB
8	Russell Winger	United States	19.11	18.85	18.73	x	x	x	19.11	
9	Ronald Julião	Brazil	17.94	x	x				17.94	
10	Michael Putman	Peru	17.74	x	x				17.74	
11	Nicholas Martina	Argentina	x	17.33	17.29				17.33	
12	Aldo Gonzales	Bolivia	17.06	17.05	x				17.06	
	O'Dayne Richards	Jamaica							DNS	
