= 2019 Tampa Bay Buccaneers season =

NFL team season

- Owner: The Glazer family
- General manager: Jason Licht
- Head coach: Bruce Arians
- Home stadium: Raymond James Stadium

Results
- Record: 7–9
- Division place: 3rd NFC South
- Playoffs: Did not qualify
- All-Pros: WR Chris Godwin (2nd team); OLB Shaquil Barrett (2nd team)
- Pro Bowlers: WR Mike Evans; WR Chris Godwin; OLB Shaquil Barrett

Uniform
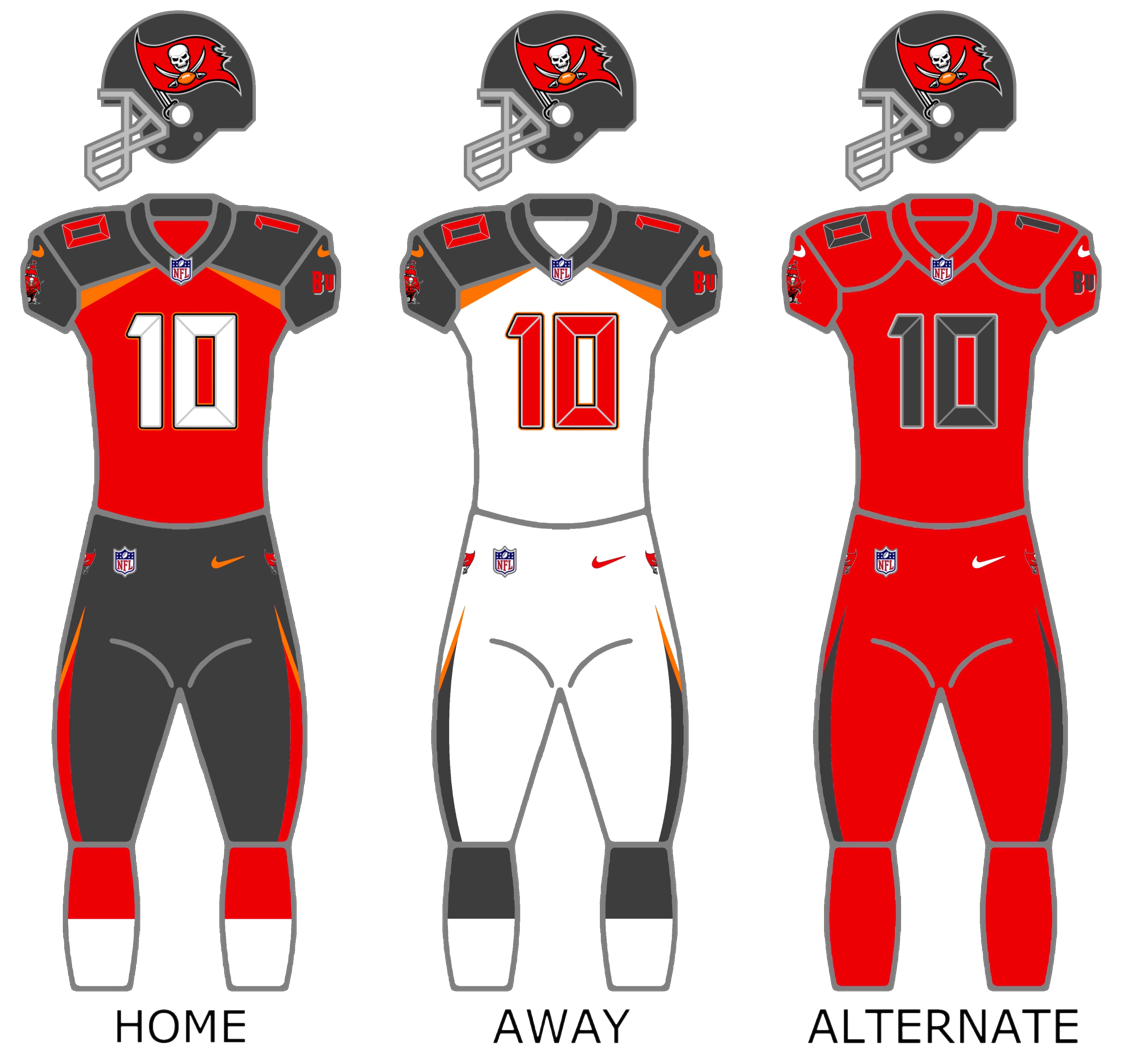

The 2019 season was the Tampa Bay Buccaneers' 44th in the National Football League (NFL), their sixth under the leadership of general manager Jason Licht, their 22nd playing their home games at Raymond James Stadium and their first under head coach Bruce Arians. Despite improving on their 5–11 record from 2018 with a Week 14 victory over the Indianapolis Colts, the Buccaneers missed the playoffs for the twelfth consecutive season after the Minnesota Vikings defeated the Detroit Lions that same day, which meant the Buccaneers were one of two teams to not qualify for the postseason in the 2010s, with the other team being the Cleveland Browns.

This season, quarterback Jameis Winston became the first quarterback in NFL history to throw at least 30 touchdown passes and 30 interceptions in a season. This was also his final season with the Buccaneers, as he was not re-signed by the team in free agency during the 2020 offseason.

Jameis Winston's 30 interceptions were the most by an NFL quarterback since Vinny Testaverde threw 35 interceptions in 1988, who coincidentally, also did so with the Buccaneers. This was the last time the Buccaneers missed the playoff until 2025.

== Offseason ==
=== Roster changes ===
==== Re-signings ====
Position	Player	Tag	Date
OT	Donovan Smith	UFA	March 5

== NFL draft ==
2019 Tampa Bay Buccaneers draft
Round	Pick	Player	Position	College	Notes
1	5	Devin White *	LB	LSU	
2	39	Sean Murphy-Bunting	CB	Central Michigan	
3	94	Jamel Dean	CB	Auburn	from L.A. Rams
3	99	Mike Edwards	S	Kentucky	from L.A. Rams
4	107	Anthony Nelson	DE	Iowa	
5	145	Matt Gay *	K	Utah	
6	208	Scotty Miller	WR	Bowling Green	from Philadelphia Eagles
7	215	Terry Beckner	DT	Missouri	from Arizona Cardinals
Made roster † Pro Football Hall of Fame * Made at least one Pro Bowl during career

Draft trades

- The Buccaneers traded their seventh-round selection in 2019 and free safety J. J. Wilcox to the Pittsburgh Steelers in exchange for Pittsburgh's sixth-round selection (202nd overall) in the 2018 NFL draft.
- The Buccaneers traded their sixth-round selection to the Arizona Cardinals in exchange for Arizona's seventh-round selection and the rights to head coach Bruce Arians.
- The Buccaneers traded their seventh-round selection in 2020 and wide receiver DeSean Jackson to the Philadelphia Eagles in exchange for Philadelphia's sixth-round selection.

== Staff ==
2019 Tampa Bay Buccaneers staff
Front office: Owner/president – Estate of Malcolm Glazer; Co-chairman – Bryan Glazer; Co-chairman – Edward Glazer; Co-chairman – Joel Glazer; General manager – Jason Licht; Director of player personnel – John Spytek; Director of football operations – Shelton Quarles; Director of college scouting – Mike Biehl; Director of pro scouting – Rob McCartney; Director of football administration – Mike Greenberg; Head coaches: Head coach – Bruce Arians; Assistant head coach/Run game coordinator – Harold Goodwin; Assistant to the head coach – Mike Chiurco; Offensive coaches: Offensive coordinator – Byron Leftwich; Quarterbacks – Clyde Christensen; Running backs – Todd McNair; Wide receivers – Kevin Garver; Tight ends – Rick Christophel; Offensive line – Joe Gilbert; Offensive assistant – Antwaan Randle El; Offensive quality control – John Van Dam; Offensive Consultant – Tom Moore	Defensive coaches: Defensive coordinator – Todd Bowles; Defensive line – Kacy Rodgers; Assistant defensive line – Lori Locust; Outside linebackers – Larry Foote; Inside linebackers – Mike Caldwell; Cornerbacks – Kevin Ross; Safeties – Nick Rapone; Defensive/special teams assistant – Cody Grimm; Defensive quality control – Tim Atkins; Special teams coaches: Special teams coordinator – Keith Armstrong; Assistant special teams – Amos Jones; Specialists – Chris Boniol; Strength and conditioning: Head strength and conditioning – Anthony Piroli; Speed and conditioning – Rodger Kingdom; Assistant strength and conditioning – Michael Stacchiotti; Assistant strength and conditioning – Chad Wade; Assistant strength and conditioning – Maral Javadifar

== Final roster ==
2019 Tampa Bay Buccaneers roster
Quarterbacks (QB): 4 Ryan Griffin; 3 Jameis Winston; Running backs (RB): 25 Peyton Barber; 27 Ronald Jones; 44 Dare Ogunbowale; Wide receivers (WR): 13 Mike Evans; 14 John Franklin; 12 Chris Godwin; 15 Cyril Grayson; 85 Jaydon Mickens; 19 Breshad Perriman; 83 Spencer Schnell; 17 Justin Watson; Tight ends (TE): 84 Cameron Brate; 80 O. J. Howard; 88 Tanner Hudson; 86 Codey McElroy	Offensive linemen (OL): 65 Alex Cappa G; 69 Demar Dotson T; 70 Jerald Hawkins T; 66 Ryan Jensen C; 74 Ali Marpet G; 76 Donovan Smith T; 64 Aaron Stinnie G; 71 Earl Watford G; 72 Josh Wells T; Defensive linemen (DL): 91 Beau Allen NT; 92 William Gholston DE; 56 Rakeem Nuñez-Roches DE; 79 Pat O'Connor DE; 93 Ndamukong Suh DE; 50 Vita Vea NT	Linebackers (LB): 96 Sam Acho OLB; 58 Shaquil Barrett OLB; 41 Kahzin Daniels OLB; 54 Lavonte David ILB; 52 Noah Dawkins ILB; 51 Kevin Minter ILB; 94 Carl Nassib OLB; 98 Anthony Nelson OLB; 90 Jason Pierre-Paul OLB; 45 Devin White ILB; Defensive backs (DB): 39 Andrew Adams FS; 33 Carlton Davis CB; 35 Jamel Dean CB; 34 Mike Edwards SS; 26 Sean Murphy-Bunting CB; 29 Ryan Smith CB; 24 Darian Stewart FS; 36 M. J. Stewart SS; 37 Mazzi Wilkins CB; Special teams (ST): 9 Matt Gay K; 8 Bradley Pinion P; 97 Zach Triner LS	Practice squad: 32 John Battle FS; 57 Quinton Bell OLB; 77 Anthony Fabiano C; 18 Ishmael Hyman WR; 6 Chad Kanoff QB; 95 Jeremiah Ledbetter DE; 87 Jordan Leggett TE; 28 Herb Miller CB; 62 Brad Seaton T; 23 Aca'Cedric Ware RB; Reserve: 82 Antony Auclair TE (IR); 61 Zack Bailey G (IR); 51 Kendell Beckwith ILB (NF-Inj.); 48 Jack Cichy ILB (IR); 38 D'Cota Dixon SS (IR); 21 Justin Evans FS (IR); 13 Mike Evans WR (IR); 11 Blaine Gabbert QB (IR); 67 Michael Liedtke T (IR); 22 T. J. Logan RB (IR); 10 Scotty Miller WR (IR); 16 Bryant Mitchell WR (IR); 30 Orion Stewart SS (IR); 31 Jordan Whitehead SS (IR); Rookies in italics 53 active, 14 reserve, 10 practice squad

== Preseason ==
Week	Date	Opponent	Result	Record	Venue	Recap
1	August 9	at Pittsburgh Steelers	L 28–30	0–1	Heinz Field	Recap
2	August 16	Miami Dolphins	W 16–14	1–1	Raymond James Stadium	Recap
3	August 23	Cleveland Browns	W 13–12	2–1	Raymond James Stadium	Recap
4	August 29	at Dallas Cowboys	W 17–15	3–1	AT&T Stadium	Recap

== Regular season ==
=== Schedule ===
Week	Date	Opponent	Result	Record	Venue	Recap
1	September 8	San Francisco 49ers	**L** 17–31	0–1	Raymond James Stadium	Recap
2	September 12	at **Carolina Panthers**	**W** 20–14	1–1	Bank of America Stadium	Recap
3	September 22	New York Giants	**L** 31–32	1–2	Raymond James Stadium	Recap
4	September 29	at Los Angeles Rams	**W** 55–40	2–2	Los Angeles Memorial Coliseum	Recap
5	October 6	at **New Orleans Saints**	**L** 24–31	2–3	Mercedes-Benz Superdome	Recap
6	October 13	**Carolina Panthers**	**L** 26–37	2–4	(United Kingdom) Tottenham Hotspur Stadium (London)	Recap
7	Bye					
8	October 27	at Tennessee Titans	**L** 23–27	2–5	Nissan Stadium	Recap
9	November 3	at Seattle Seahawks	**L** 34–40 (OT)	2–6	CenturyLink Field	Recap
10	November 10	Arizona Cardinals	**W** 30–27	3–6	Raymond James Stadium	Recap
11	November 17	**New Orleans Saints**	**L** 17–34	3–7	Raymond James Stadium	Recap
12	November 24	at **Atlanta Falcons**	**W** 35–22	4–7	Mercedes-Benz Stadium	Recap
13	December 1	at Jacksonville Jaguars	**W** 28–11	5–7	TIAA Bank Field	Recap
14	December 8	Indianapolis Colts	**W** 38–35	6–7	Raymond James Stadium	Recap
15	December 15	at Detroit Lions	**W** 38–17	7–7	Ford Field	Recap
16	December 21	Houston Texans	**L** 20–23	7–8	Raymond James Stadium	Recap
17	December 29	**Atlanta Falcons**	**L** 22–28 (OT)	7–9	Raymond James Stadium	Recap

Note: Intra-division opponents are in bold text.

=== Game summaries ===
==== Week 1: vs. San Francisco 49ers ====
Week One: San Francisco 49ers at Tampa Bay Buccaneers – Game summary

Quarter	1	2	3	4	Total
**49ers**	3	3	14	11	**31**
Buccaneers	0	7	7	3	**17**

at Raymond James Stadium, Tampa, Florida

- Date: September 8
- Game time: 4:25 p.m. EDT
- Game weather: Cloudy, 93 °F (34 °C)
- Game attendance: 55,976
- Referee: Alex Kemp
- TV announcers (Fox): Kenny Albert, Ronde Barber and Lindsay Czarniak
- Recap, Game Book

Game information

**First quarter**

- SF – Robbie Gould 29-yard field goal, 11:08. 49ers 3–0. **Drive: 6 plays, 22 yards, 2:20.**

**Second quarter**

- TB – Vernon Hargreaves 15-yard interception return (Matt Gay kick) 8:41. Buccaneers 7–3.
- SF – Robbie Gould 36-yard field goal, 2:55. Buccaneers 7–6. **Drive: 11 plays, 57 yards, 5:46.**

**Third quarter**

- SF – Richie James 39-yard pass from Jimmy Garoppolo (Robbie Gould kick), 12:31. 49ers 13–7. **Drive: 7 plays, 75 yards, 2:29.**
- SF – Richard Sherman 31-yard interception return (Robbie Gould kick) 11:44. 49ers 20–7.
- TB – Chris Godwin 10-yard pass from Jameis Winston (Matt Gay kick), 5:43. 49ers 20–14. **Drive: 11 plays, 75 yards, 6:01.**

**Fourth quarter**

- TB – Matt Gay 31-yard field goal, 4:47. 49ers 20–17. **Drive: 6 plays, 28 yards, 3:34.**
- SF – Robbie Gould 47-yard field goal, 2:17. 49ers 23–17. **Drive: 8 plays, 46 yards, 2:30.**
- SF – Ahkello Witherspoon 25-yard interception return (Jimmy Garoppolo–Deebo Samuel pass), 2:01. 49ers 31–17.

**Top passers**

- SF – Jimmy Garoppolo – 18/27, 166 yards, TD, INT
- TB – Jameis Winston – 20/36, 194 yards, TD, 3 INT

**Top rushers**

- SF – Raheem Mostert – 9 rushes, 40 yards
- TB – Ronald Jones – 13 rushes, 75 yards

**Top receivers**

- SF – George Kittle – 8 receptions, 54 yards
- TB – Chris Godwin – 3 receptions, 53 yards, TD

Bruce Arians had his regular season debut as head coach. Quarterback Jameis Winston threw three interceptions, two returned for a touchdown, as Tampa Bay lost on opening day to San Francisco.

==== Week 2: at Carolina Panthers ====
Week Two: Tampa Bay Buccaneers at Carolina Panthers – Game summary

Quarter	1	2	3	4	Total
**Buccaneers**	3	7	7	3	**20**
Panthers	3	6	3	2	**14**

at Bank of America Stadium, Charlotte, North Carolina

- Date: September 12
- Game time: 8:20 p.m. EDT
- Game weather: Cloudy, 85 °F (29 °C)
- Game attendance: 71,101
- Referee: Jerome Boger
- TV announcers (NFLN): Joe Buck, Troy Aikman, Erin Andrews and Kristina Pink
- Recap, Game Book

Game information

**First quarter**

- TB – Matt Gay 40-yard field goal, 5:36. Buccaneers 3–0. **Drive: 6 plays, 32 yards, 2:55.**
- CAR – Joey Slye 32-yard field goal, 2:52. Tied 3–3. **Drive: 8 plays, 61 yards, 2:44.**

**Second quarter**

- CAR – Joey Slye 37-yard field goal, 8:26. Panthers 6–3. **Drive: 5 plays, 23 yards, 1:29.**
- TB – Chris Godwin 20-yard pass from Jameis Winston (Matt Gay kick), 1:20. Buccaneers 10–6. **Drive: 5 plays, 72 yards, 2:27.**
- CAR – Joey Slye 54-yard field goal, 0:00. Buccaneers 10–9. **Drive: 9 plays, 39 yards, 1:20.**

**Third quarter**

- CAR – Joey Slye 51-yard field goal, 7:51. Panthers 12–10. **Drive: 6 plays, 29 yards, 3:30.**
- TB – Peyton Barber 16-yard run (Matt Gay kick), 4:20. Buccaneers 17–12. **Drive: 7 plays, 75 yards, 3:31.**

**Fourth quarter**

- CAR – Peyton Barber tackled in the end zone by Luke Kuechly for a safety, 13:21. Buccaneers 17–14.
- TB – Matt Gay 32-yard field goal, 2:26. Buccaneers 20–14. **Drive: 11 plays, 53 yards, 6:32.**

**Top passers**

- TB – Jameis Winston – 16/25, 208 yards, TD
- CAR – Cam Newton – 24/50, 324 yards

**Top rushers**

- TB – Peyton Barber – 23 rushes, 82 yards, TD
- CAR – Christian McCaffrey – 16 rushes, 37 yards

**Top receivers**

- TB – Chris Godwin – 8 receptions, 121 yards, TD
- CAR – Greg Olsen – 6 receptions, 110 yards

The Buccaneers led 20–14 late in the fourth quarter. In the final two minutes, Cam Newton drove the Panthers to the Tampa Bay 2-yard line. Facing a 4th-and-1 at the 2-yard line, Christian McCaffrey took a direct snap and made a fake reverse handoff, but was pushed out of bounds just short of the line to gain. Tampa Bay held on to win, their first under Bruce Arians.

==== Week 3: vs. New York Giants ====
Week Three: New York Giants at Tampa Bay Buccaneers – Game summary

Quarter	1	2	3	4	Total
**Giants**	3	7	15	7	**32**
Buccaneers	12	16	0	3	**31**

at Raymond James Stadium, Tampa, Florida

- Date: September 22
- Game time: 4:05 p.m. EDT
- Game weather: Cloudy, 88 °F (31 °C)
- Game attendance: 55,070
- Referee: Bill Vinovich
- TV announcers (Fox): Kenny Albert, Ronde Barber, Tiki Barber and Sara Walsh
- Recap, Game Book

Game information

**First quarter**

- TB – Mike Evans 21-yard pass from Jameis Winston (kick failed, wide left), 9:47. Buccaneers 6–0. **Drive: 10 plays, 75 yards, 5:13.**
- NYG – Aldrick Rosas 36-yard field goal, 4:07. Buccaneers 6–3. **Drive: 11 plays, 57 yards, 5:40.**
- TB – Mike Evans 3-yard pass from Jameis Winston (kick blocked), 0:21. Buccaneers 12–3. **Drive: 9 plays, 75 yards, 3:46.**

**Second quarter**

- NYG – Daniel Jones 7-yard run (Aldrick Rosas kick), 9:58. Buccaneers 12–10. **Drive: 12 plays, 75 yards, 5:23.**
- TB – Matt Gay 47-yard field goal, 7:35. Buccaneers 15–10. **Drive: 5 plays, 46 yards, 2:23.**
- TB – Matt Gay 27-yard field goal, 4:06. Buccaneers 18–10. **Drive: 6 plays, 62 yards, 1:55.**
- TB – Mike Evans 20-yard pass from Jameis Winston (Matt Gay kick), 1:26. Buccaneers 25–10. **Drive: 3 plays, 41 yards, 0:49.**
- TB – Matt Gay 52-yard field goal, 0:00. Buccaneers 28–10. **Drive: 6 plays, 46 yards, 0:36.**

**Third quarter**

- NYG – Evan Engram 75-yard pass from Daniel Jones (Daniel Jones–Sterling Shepard pass), 14:48. Buccaneers 28–18. **Drive: 1 play, 75 yards, 0:12.**
- NYG – Sterling Shepard 7-yard pass from Daniel Jones (Aldrick Rosas kick), 8:14. Buccaneers 28–25. **Drive: 8 plays, 80 yards, 3:57.**

**Fourth quarter**

- TB – Matt Gay 23-yard field goal, 6:00. Buccaneers 31–25. **Drive: 8 plays, 37 yards, 4:27.**
- NYG – Daniel Jones 7-yard run (Aldrick Rosas kick), 1:16. Giants 32–31. **Drive: 8 plays, 75 yards, 2:00.**

**Top passers**

- NYG – Daniel Jones – 23/36, 336 yards, 2 TD
- TB – Jameis Winston – 23/37, 380 yards, 3 TD, INT

**Top rushers**

- NYG – Daniel Jones – 4 rushes, 28 yards, 2 TD
- TB – Ronald Jones – 14 rushes, 80 yards

**Top receivers**

- NYG – Evan Engram – 6 receptions, 113 yards, TD
- TB – Mike Evans – 8 receptions, 190 yards, 3 TD

Tampa Bay blew an 18-point lead in the second half. The New York Giants rallied behind rookie quarterback Daniel Jones, and took a 32–31 lead with 1:16 remaining in regulation. Jameis Winston connected with Mike Evans for a 44-yard reception all the way down to the Giants 9-yard line in the final seconds, but rookie kicker Matt Gay's field goal attempt sailed wide right as time expired and the Giants held on to win.

==== Week 4: at Los Angeles Rams ====
Week Four: Tampa Bay Buccaneers at Los Angeles Rams – Game summary

Quarter	1	2	3	4	Total
**Buccaneers**	7	21	3	24	**55**
Rams	0	17	3	20	**40**

at Los Angeles Memorial Coliseum, Los Angeles, California

- Date: September 29
- Game time: 4:05 p.m. EDT/1:05 p.m. PDT
- Game weather: Mostly sunny, 74 °F (23 °C)
- Game attendance: 68,117
- Referee: Brad Rogers
- TV announcers (Fox): Chris Myers, Daryl Johnston and Laura Okmin
- Recap, Game Book

Game information

**First quarter**

- TB – Peyton Barber 3-yard run (Matt Gay kick), 10:53. Buccaneers 7–0. **Drive: 8 plays, 60 yards, 4:07.**

**Second quarter**

- TB – Chris Godwin 3-yard pass from Jameis Winston (Matt Gay kick), 9:57. Buccaneers 14–0. **Drive: 7 plays, 50 yards, 3:27.**
- TB – Chris Godwin 9-yard pass from Jameis Winston (Matt Gay kick), 8:28. Buccaneers 21–0. **Drive: 1 play, 9 yards, 0:07.**
- LAR – Todd Gurley 13-yard run (Greg Zuerlein kick), 5:34. Buccaneers 21–7. **Drive: 8 plays, 75 yards, 2:54.**
- LAR – Gerald Everett 5-yard pass from Jared Goff (Greg Zuerlein kick), 2:50. Buccaneers 21–14. **Drive: 4 plays, 50 yards, 1:12.**
- TB – Ronald Jones 5-yard run (Matt Gay kick), 0:47. Buccaneers 28–14. **Drive: 11 plays, 75 yards, 2:03.**
- LAR – Greg Zuerlein 58-yard field goal, 0:02. Buccaneers 28–17. **Drive: 6 plays, 35 yards, 0:45.**

**Third quarter**

- LAR – Greg Zuerlein 44-yard field goal, 9:03. Buccaneers 28–20. **Drive: 14 plays, 49 yards, 5:57.**
- TB – Matt Gay 58-yard field goal, 4:33. Buccaneers 31–20. **Drive: 10 plays, 35 yards, 4:30.**

**Fourth quarter**

- TB – Cameron Brate 13-yard pass from Jameis Winston (Matt Gay kick), 14:55. Buccaneers 38–20. **Drive: 6 plays, 53 yards, 2:54.**
- LAR – Todd Gurley 5-yard run (Greg Zuerlein kick), 12:31. Buccaneers 38–27. **Drive: 8 plays, 75 yards, 2:24.**
- TB – Mike Evans 67-yard pass from Jameis Winston (Matt Gay kick), 11:35. Buccaneers 45–27. **Drive: 2 plays, 72 yards, 0:56.**
- LAR – Cooper Kupp 29-yard pass from Jared Goff (Greg Zuerlein kick), 9:12. Buccaneers 45–34. **Drive: 8 plays, 75 yards, 2:23.**
- LAR – Marcus Peters 32-yard interception return (pass failed), 8:11. Buccaneers 45–40.
- TB – Matt Gay 21-yard field goal, 2:35. Buccaneers 48–40. **Drive: 11 plays, 72 yards, 5:36.**
- TB – Ndamukong Suh 37-yard fumble return (Matt Gay kick), 1:06. Buccaneers 55–40.

**Top passers**

- TB – Jameis Winston – 28/41, 385 yards, 4 TD, INT
- LAR – Jared Goff – 45/68, 517 yards, 2 TD, 3 INT

**Top rushers**

- TB – Ronald Jones – 19 rushes, 70 yards, TD
- LAR – Todd Gurley – 5 rushes, 16 yards, 2 TD

**Top receivers**

- TB – Chris Godwin – 12 receptions, 172 yards, 2 TD
- LAR – Robert Woods – 13 receptions, 164 yards

The Bucs set a franchise record for points scored with 55 in a win against the defending NFC champions. Chris Godwin had the best game of his career, catching 12 passes for 172 yards and two touchdowns, while Mike Evans hauled in a 67-yard pass for a touchdown. The Buccaneers defense picked off Jared Goff three times and forced one fumble that was returned for a touchdown by former Rams defensive tackle Ndamukong Suh to close out the game. Shaquil Barrett continued his run for Defensive Player of the Year by getting an interception, a sack and forcing the fumble that ended the game.

==== Week 5: at New Orleans Saints ====
Week Five: Tampa Bay Buccaneers at New Orleans Saints – Game summary

Quarter	1	2	3	4	Total
Buccaneers	7	3	7	7	**24**
**Saints**	3	14	7	7	**31**

at Mercedes-Benz Superdome, New Orleans, Louisiana

- Date: October 6
- Game time: 1:00 p.m. EDT/12:00 p.m. CDT
- Game weather: None (indoor stadium)
- Game attendance: 73,029
- Referee: Brad Allen
- TV announcers (Fox): Chris Myers, Daryl Johnston and Laura Okmin
- Recap, Game Book

Game information

**First quarter**

- NO – Wil Lutz 29-yard field goal, 3:58. Saints 3–0. **Drive: 9 plays, 53 yards, 4:25.**
- TB – Chris Godwin 26-yard pass from Jameis Winston (Matt Gay kick), 0:10. Buccaneers 7–3. **Drive: 2 plays, 20 yards, 0:54.**

**Second quarter**

- NO – Michael Thomas 14-yard pass from Teddy Bridgewater (Wil Lutz kick), 10:13. Saints 10–7. **Drive: 9 plays, 75 yards, 4:57.**
- TB – Matt Gay 42-yard field goal, 5:33. Tied 10–10. **Drive: 8 plays, 51 yards, 4:40.**
- NO – Jared Cook 9-yard pass from Teddy Bridgewater (Wil Lutz kick), 0:32. Saints 17–10. **Drive: 8 plays, 75 yards, 5:01.**

**Third quarter**

- NO – Ted Ginn Jr. 33-yard pass from Teddy Bridgewater (Wil Lutz kick), 13:44. Saints 24–10. **Drive: 3 plays, 75 yards, 1:16.**
- TB – Peyton Barber 2-yard run (Matt Gay kick), 5:03. Saints 24–17. **Drive: 17 plays, 75 yards, 8:41.**

**Fourth quarter**

- NO – Michael Thomas 12-yard pass from Teddy Bridgewater (Wil Lutz kick), 10:37. Saints 31–17. **Drive: 13 plays, 91 yards, 6:27.**
- TB – Chris Godwin 26-yard pass from Jameis Winston (Matt Gay kick), 0:13. Saints 31–24. **Drive: 6 plays, 78 yards, 0:57.**

**Top passers**

- TB – Jameis Winston – 15/27, 204 yards, 2 TD
- NO – Teddy Bridgewater – 26/34, 314 yards, 4 TD, INT

**Top rushers**

- TB – Ronald Jones – 9 rushes, 35 yards
- NO – Alvin Kamara – 16 rushes, 62 yards

**Top receivers**

- TB – Chris Godwin – 7 receptions, 125 yards, 2 TD
- NO – Michael Thomas – 11 receptions, 182 yards, 2 TD

Teddy Bridgewater threw for 314 yards and four touchdown passes, as New Orleans defeated Tampa Bay 31–24. The Saints racked up 457 yards of offense against a lackluster Buccaneers defense.

==== Week 6: vs. Carolina Panthers ====
NFL London Games

Week Six: Carolina Panthers at Tampa Bay Buccaneers – Game summary

Quarter	1	2	3	4	Total
**Panthers**	10	7	10	10	**37**
Buccaneers	0	7	3	16	**26**

at Tottenham Hotspur Stadium, London, England

- Date: October 13
- Game time: 2:30 p.m. BST/9:30 a.m. EDT
- Game weather: Mostly cloudy, 61 °F (16 °C)
- Game attendance: 60,087
- Referee: Walt Anderson
- TV announcers (NFLN): Rich Eisen, Kurt Warner, Steve Mariucci, Michael Irvin and Melissa Stark
- Recap, Game Book

Game information

**First quarter**

- CAR – Joey Slye 49-yard field goal, 13:20. Panthers 3–0. **Drive: 4 plays, −2 yards, 1:30.**
- CAR – Christian McCaffrey 1-yard run (Joey Slye kick), 1:05. Panthers 10–0. **Drive: 12 plays, 99 yards, 7:32.**

**Second quarter**

- TB – Ronald Jones 5-yard run (Matt Gay kick), 12:43. Panthers 10–7. **Drive: 3 plays, 37 yards, 1:19.**
- CAR – Christian McCaffrey 25-yard pass from Kyle Allen (Joey Slye kick), 7:32. Panthers 17–7. **Drive: 4 plays, 36 yards, 1:39.**

**Third quarter**

- CAR – Joey Slye 46-yard field goal, 8:21. Panthers 20–7. **Drive: 5 plays, 39 yards, 1:58.**
- CAR – Curtis Samuel 8-yard run (Joey Slye kick), 8:05. Panthers 27–7. **Drive: 1 play, 8 yards, 0:05.**
- TB – Matt Gay 54-yard field goal, 5:27. Panthers 27–10. **Drive: 7 plays, 39 yards, 2:38.**

**Fourth quarter**

- CAR – Curtis Samuel 13-yard pass from Kyle Allen (Joey Slye kick), 14:55. Panthers 34–10. **Drive: 10 plays, 75 yards, 5:32.**
- TB – Cameron Brate 10-yard pass from Jameis Winston (Jameis Winston–Mike Evans pass), 12:51. Panthers 34–18. **Drive: 6 plays, 75 yards, 2:04.**
- CAR – Joey Slye 29-yard field goal, 7:56. Panthers 37–18. **Drive: 4 plays, 6 yards, 1:59.**
- TB – Dare Ogunbowale 3-yard run (Jameis Winston run), 4:47. Panthers 37–26. **Drive: 11 plays, 75 yards, 3:09.**

**Top passers**

- CAR – Kyle Allen – 20/32, 227 yards, 2 TD
- TB – Jameis Winston – 30/54, 400 yards, TD, 5 INT

**Top rushers**

- CAR – Christian McCaffrey – 22 rushes, 31 yards, TD
- TB – Peyton Barber – 8 rushes, 28 yards

**Top receivers**

- CAR – D. J. Moore – 7 receptions, 73 yards
- TB – Chris Godwin – 10 receptions, 151 yards

Jameis Winston threw five interceptions, had two fumbles (one lost) and was sacked seven times. The Buccaneers committed seven turnovers in a 37–26 loss to Carolina in London.

==== Week 8: at Tennessee Titans ====
Week Eight: Tampa Bay Buccaneers at Tennessee Titans – Game summary

Quarter	1	2	3	4	Total
Buccaneers	3	12	8	0	**23**
**Titans**	14	3	3	7	**27**

at Nissan Stadium, Nashville, Tennessee

- Date: October 27
- Game time: 1:00 p.m. EDT/12:00 p.m. CDT
- Game weather: Cloudy, 59 °F (15 °C)
- Game attendance: 62,073
- Referee: Adrian Hill
- TV announcers (Fox): Kevin Kugler, Matt Millen and Shane Bacon
- Recap, Game Book

Game information

**First quarter**

- TB – Matt Gay 22-yard field goal, 11:28. Buccaneers 3–0. **Drive: 8 plays, 71 yards, 3:32.**
- TEN – Jonnu Smith 5-yard pass from Ryan Tannehill (Cody Parkey kick), 8:55. Titans 7–3. **Drive: 1 play, 10 yards, 0:03.**
- TEN – Tajae Sharpe 6-yard pass from Ryan Tannehill (Cody Parkey kick), 0:24. Titans 14–3. **Drive: 3 plays, 6 yards, 0:15.**

**Second quarter**

- TB – Matt Gay 48-yard field goal, 7:51. Titans 14–6. **Drive: 16 plays, 45 yards, 7:33.**
- TB – Matt Gay 24-yard field goal, 3:47. Titans 14–9. **Drive: 5 plays, 28 yards, 2:15.**
- TEN – Cody Parkey 51-yard field goal, 1:09. Titans 17–9. **Drive: 5 plays, 22 yards, 2:38.**
- TB – Mike Evans 9-yard pass from Jameis Winston (pass failed), 0:15. Titans 17–15. **Drive: 8 plays, 75 yards, 0:54.**

**Third quarter**

- TB – Mike Evans 2-yard pass from Jameis Winston (Jameis Winston-Chris Godwin pass), 11:11. Buccaneers 23–17. **Drive: 4 plays, 56 yards, 1:49.**
- TEN – Cody Parkey 42-yard field goal, 0:37. Buccaneers 23–20. **Drive: 10 plays, 68 yards, 4:43.**

**Fourth quarter**

- TEN – A. J. Brown 8-yard pass from Ryan Tannehill (Cody Parkey kick), 6:55. Titans 27–23. **Drive: 12 plays, 90 yards, 6:54.**

**Top passers**

- TB – Jameis Winston – 21/43, 301 yards, 2 TD, 2 INT
- TEN – Ryan Tannehill – 21/33, 193 yards, 3 TD

**Top rushers**

- TB – Jameis Winston – 8 rushes, 53 yards
- TEN – Derrick Henry – 16 rushes, 75 yards

**Top receivers**

- TB – Mike Evans – 11 receptions, 198 yards, 2 TD
- TEN – Jonnu Smith – 6 receptions, 78 yards, TD

Jameis Winston had 4 turnovers (two interceptions and two lost fumbles) as the Buccaneers lost 27–23 to the Titans.

==== Week 9: at Seattle Seahawks ====
Week Nine: Tampa Bay Buccaneers at Seattle Seahawks – Game summary

Quarter	1	2	3	4	OT	Total
Buccaneers	14	7	3	10	0	**34**
**Seahawks**	7	6	8	13	6	**40**

at CenturyLink Field, Seattle, Washington

- Date: November 3
- Game time: 4:05 p.m. EST/1:05 p.m. PST
- Game attendance: 68,948
- Referee: John Hussey
- TV announcers (Fox): Kenny Albert, Ronde Barber and Sara Walsh
- Recap, Game Book

Game information

**First quarter**

- TB – Ronald Jones 8-yard run (Matt Gay kick), 11:30. Buccaneers 7–0. **Drive: 7 plays, 75 yards, 3:30.**
- SEA – Tyler Lockett 19-yard pass from Russell Wilson (Jason Myers kick), 8:23. Tied 7–7. **Drive: 6 plays, 75 yards, 3:07.**
- TB – Breshad Perriman 15-yard pass from Jameis Winston (Matt Gay kick), 0:48. Buccaneers 14–7. **Drive: 9 plays, 69 yards, 4:39.**

**Second quarter**

- TB – Mike Evans 5-yard pass from Jameis Winston (Matt Gay kick), 4:32. Buccaneers 21–7. **Drive: 12 plays, 63 yards, 6:31.**
- SEA – Jacob Hollister 1-yard pass from Russell Wilson (kick failed, wide right), 0:29. Buccaneers 21–13. **Drive: 4 plays, 60 yards, 1:14.**

**Third quarter**

- SEA – Tyler Lockett 2-yard pass from Russell Wilson (Russell Wilson-DK Metcalf pass), 8:03. Tied 21–21. **Drive: 5 plays, 85 yards, 2:46.**
- TB – Matt Gay 41-yard field goal, 3:18. Buccaneers 24–21. **Drive: 10 plays, 52 yards, 4:45.**

**Fourth quarter**

- SEA – Jason Myers 37-yard field goal, 14:26. Tied 24–24. **Drive: 9 plays, 56 yards, 3:52.**
- SEA – Jason Myers 22-yard field goal, 8:19. Seahawks 27–24. **Drive: 6 plays, 11 yards, 2:19.**
- TB – Matt Gay 45-yard field goal, 5:22. Tied 27–27. **Drive: 6 plays, 44 yards, 2:57.**
- SEA – DK Metcalf 53-yard pass from Russell Wilson (Jason Myers kick), 4:25. Seahawks 34–27. **Drive: 3 plays, 75 yards, 0:57.**
- TB – Dare Ogunbowale 1-yard run (Matt Gay kick), 0:46. Tied 34–34. **Drive: 10 plays, 75 yards, 3:39.**

**Overtime**

- SEA – Jacob Hollister 10-yard pass from Russell Wilson, 6:22. Seahawks 40–34. **Drive: 10 plays, 75 yards, 3:38.**

**Top passers**

- TB – Jameis Winston – 29/44, 335 yards, 2 TD
- SEA – Russell Wilson – 29/43, 378 yards, 5 TD

**Top rushers**

- TB – Ronald Jones – 18 rushes, 67 yards, TD
- SEA – Chris Carson – 16 rushes, 105 yards

**Top receivers**

- TB – Mike Evans – 12 receptions, 180 yards, TD
- SEA – Tyler Lockett – 13 receptions, 152 yards, 2 TD

Russell Wilson threw for 378 yards and five touchdown passes while the then league's best rushing defense allowed their first 100 yard rusher of the season as Chris Carson ran for 105 yards and the Seahawks produced 523 total yards against a porous Buccaneers defense en route to a 40–34 win in overtime.

==== Week 10: vs. Arizona Cardinals ====
Week Ten: Arizona Cardinals at Tampa Bay Buccaneers – Game summary

Quarter	1	2	3	4	Total
Cardinals	3	10	7	7	**27**
**Buccaneers**	7	10	3	10	**30**

at Raymond James Stadium, Tampa, Florida

- Date: November 10
- Game time: 1:00 p.m. EST
- Game weather: Sunny, 77 °F (25 °C)
- Game attendance: 40,038
- Referee: Craig Wrolstad
- TV announcers (Fox): Thom Brennaman, Chris Spielman and Shannon Spake
- Recap, Game Book

Game information

**First quarter**

- ARI – Zane Gonzalez 37-yard field goal, 11:13. Cardinals 3–0. **Drive: 7 plays, 18 yards, 2:28.**
- TB – Ronald Jones 7-yard run (Matt Gay kick), 3:42. Buccaneers 7–3. **Drive: 11 plays, 60 yards, 7:31.**

**Second quarter**

- ARI – Zane Gonzalez 54-yard field goal, 14:14. Buccaneers 7–6. **Drive: 11 plays, 39 yards, 4:28.**
- TB – Matt Gay 30-yard field goal, 8:53. Buccaneers 10–6. **Drive: 12 plays, 63 yards, 5:21.**
- ARI – Christian Kirk 33-yard pass from Kyler Murray (Zane Gonzalez kick), 1:03. Cardinals 13–10. **Drive: 9 plays, 96 yards, 3:11.**
- TB – O. J. Howard 10-yard pass from Jameis Winston (Matt Gay kick), 0:08. Buccaneers 17–13. **Drive: 7 plays, 75 yards, 0:55.**

**Third quarter**

- TB – Matt Gay 45-yard field goal, 8:37. Buccaneers 20–13. **Drive: 9 plays, 49 yards, 4:31.**
- ARI – Christian Kirk 69-yard pass from Kyler Murray (Zane Gonzalez kick), 8:10. Tied 20–20. **Drive: 2 plays, 75 yards, 0:27.**

**Fourth quarter**

- TB – Matt Gay 41-yard field goal, 9:44. Buccaneers 23–20. **Drive: 12 plays, 66 yards, 6:30.**
- ARI – Christian Kirk 15-yard pass from Kyler Murray (Zane Gonzalez kick), 7:22. Cardinals 27–23. **Drive: 8 plays, 75 yards, 2:22.**
- TB – Peyton Barber 1-yard run (Matt Gay kick), 1:43. Buccaneers 30–27. **Drive: 6 plays, 92 yards, 1:57.**

**Top passers**

- ARI – Kyler Murray – 27/44, 324 yards, 3 TD, INT
- TB – Jameis Winston – 30/48, 358 yards, TD, 2 INT

**Top rushers**

- ARI – Kyler Murray – 3 rushes, 38 yards
- TB – Peyton Barber – 11 rushes, 43 yards, TD

**Top receivers**

- ARI – Christian Kirk – 6 receptions, 138 yards, 3 TD
- TB – Mike Evans – 4 receptions, 82 yards

This was the first time head coach Bruce Arians faced his former team, the Cardinals, whom he coached from 2013 to 2017. Rookie Jamel Dean made a crucial interception with less than 4 minutes remaining in the game, allowing the offense the opportunity to drive down the field and for running back Peyton Barber to score the game clinching touchdown as the Buccaneers won 30–27.

==== Week 11: vs. New Orleans Saints ====
Week Eleven: New Orleans Saints at Tampa Bay Buccaneers – Game summary

Quarter	1	2	3	4	Total
**Saints**	13	7	7	7	**34**
Buccaneers	0	7	10	0	**17**

at Raymond James Stadium, Tampa, Florida

- Date: November 17
- Game time: 1:00 p.m. EST
- Game weather: Cloudy, 55 °F (13 °C)
- Game attendance: 54,333
- Referee: Brad Rogers
- TV announcers (Fox): Thom Brennaman, Chris Spielman and Shannon Spake
- Recap, Game Book

Game information

**First quarter**

- NO – Wil Lutz 44-yard field goal, 8:45. Saints 3–0. **Drive: 10 plays, 60 yards, 6:15.**
- NO – Wil Lutz 26-yard field goal, 0:50. Saints 6–0. **Drive: 12 plays, 68 yards, 7:01.**
- NO – Michael Thomas 16-yard pass from Drew Brees (Wil Lutz kick), 0:00. Saints 13–0. **Drive: 1 play, 16 yards, 0:03.**

**Second quarter**

- NO – Jared Cook 3-yard pass from Drew Brees (Wil Lutz kick), 5:13. Saints 20–0. **Drive: 13 plays, 51 yards, 6:42.**
- TB – Peyton Barber 6-yard pass from Jameis Winston (Matt Gay kick), 2:42. Saints 20–7. **Drive: 7 plays, 75 yards, 2:31.**

**Third quarter**

- TB – Matt Gay 55-yard field goal, 11:08. Saints 20–10. **Drive: 10 plays, 38 yards, 3:52.**
- NO – Ted Ginn Jr. 6-yard pass from Drew Brees (Wil Lutz kick), 5:27. Saints 27–10. **Drive: 10 plays, 75 yards, 5:41.**
- TB – Chris Godwin 30-yard pass from Jameis Winston (Matt Gay kick), 1:22. Saints 27–17. **Drive: 8 plays, 75 yards, 4:05.**

**Fourth quarter**

- NO – Marcus Williams 55-yard interception return (Wil Lutz kick), 5:07. Saints 34–17.

**Top passers**

- NO – Drew Brees – 28/35, 228 yards, 3 TD
- TB – Jameis Winston – 30/51, 313 yards, 2 TD, 4 INT

**Top rushers**

- NO – Alvin Kamara – 23 rushes, 75 yards
- TB – Jameis Winston – 2 rushes, 23 yards

**Top receivers**

- NO – Michael Thomas – 8 receptions, 114 yards, TD
- TB – Cameron Brate – 10 receptions, 73 yards

Jameis Winston threw 4 interceptions with one returned for a touchdown while Drew Brees threw for 3 touchdowns in a dominant 34–17 rout.

==== Week 12: at Atlanta Falcons ====
Week Twelve: Tampa Bay Buccaneers at Atlanta Falcons – Game summary

Quarter	1	2	3	4	Total
**Buccaneers**	7	12	6	10	**35**
Falcons	10	0	3	9	**22**

at Mercedes-Benz Stadium, Atlanta, Georgia

- Date: November 24
- Game time: 1:00 p.m. EST
- Game weather: None (retractable roof closed)
- Game attendance: 71,463
- Referee: Clay Martin
- TV announcers (Fox): Dick Stockton, Mark Schlereth and Jennifer Hale
- Recap, Game Book

Game information

**First quarter**

- ATL – Younghoe Koo 25-yard field goal, 12:47. Falcons 3–0. **Drive: 7 plays, 68 yards, 2:13.**
- TB – Chris Godwin 71-yard pass from Jameis Winston (Matt Gay kick), 6:45. Buccaneers 7–3. **Drive: 5 plays, 97 yards, 2:37.**
- ATL – Qadree Ollison 1-yard run (Younghoe Koo kick), 0:46. Falcons 10–7. **Drive: 6 plays, 19 yards, 2:31.**

**Second quarter**

- TB – Chris Godwin 1-yard pass from Jameis Winston (kick failed, wide left), 7:51. Buccaneers 13–10. **Drive: 6 plays, 51 yards, 3:31.**
- TB – Vita Vea 1-yard pass from Jameis Winston (kick failed, wide left), 0:40. Buccaneers 19–10. **Drive: 11 plays, 95 yards, 4:04.**

**Third quarter**

- TB – Ronald Jones 4-yard run (kick blocked), 10:58. Buccaneers 25–10. **Drive: 9 plays, 75 yards, 4:02.**
- ATL – Younghoe Koo 40-yard field goal, 1:40. Buccaneers 25–13. **Drive: 13 plays, 34 yards, 5:56.**

**Fourth quarter**

- TB – Matt Gay 32-yard field goal, 12:58. Buccaneers 28–13. **Drive: 8 plays, 61 yards, 3:52.**
- ATL – Younghoe Koo 38-yard field goal, 8:12. Buccaneers 28–16. **Drive: 13 plays, 55 yards, 4:36.**
- TB – Ndamukong Suh 6-yard fumble return (Matt Gay kick), 3:06. Buccaneers 35–16.
- ATL – Calvin Ridley 21-yard pass from Matt Schaub (pass failed), 1:50. Buccaneers 35–22. **Drive: 9 plays, 75 yards, 1:16.**

**Top passers**

- TB – Jameis Winston – 18/28, 313 yards, 3 TD, 2 INT
- ATL – Matt Ryan – 23/46, 271 yards, INT

**Top rushers**

- TB – Ronald Jones – 12 rushes, 51 yards, TD
- ATL – Qadree Ollison – 8 rushes, 20 yards, TD

**Top receivers**

- TB – Chris Godwin – 7 receptions, 184 yards, 2 TD
- ATL – Calvin Ridley – 6 receptions, 85 yards, TD

Quarterback Matt Ryan was sacked 6 times, fumbled twice with one returned for a touchdown by Ndamukong Suh, and threw an interception while Jameis Winston threw 3 touchdowns and Chris Godwin caught 7 passes for a career high 184 yards and 2 touchdowns en route to a dominant 35–22 win. Nose tackle Vita Vea became the heaviest man in NFL history to catch a touchdown pass at 347 pounds.

==== Week 13: at Jacksonville Jaguars ====
Week Thirteen: Tampa Bay Buccaneers at Jacksonville Jaguars – Game summary

Quarter	1	2	3	4	Total
**Buccaneers**	15	10	0	3	**28**
Jaguars	0	0	3	8	**11**

at TIAA Bank Field, Jacksonville, Florida

- Date: December 1
- Game time: 1:00 p.m. EST
- Game attendance: 62,633
- Referee: Walt Anderson
- TV announcers (Fox): Dick Stockton, Mark Schlereth and Jennifer Hale
- Recap, Game Book

Game information

**First quarter**

- TB – Peyton Barber 15-yard run (Matt Gay kick), 2:49. Buccaneers 7–0. **Drive: 8 plays, 69 yards, 3:40.**
- TB – Devin White 14-yard fumble return (Peyton Barber run), 2:39. Buccaneers 15–0.

**Second quarter**

- TB – Peyton Barber 1-yard run (Matt Gay kick), 7:58. Buccaneers 22–0. **Drive: 7 plays, 83 yards, 3:22.**
- TB – Matt Gay 25-yard field goal, 0:57. Buccaneers 25–0. **Drive: 7 plays, 47 yards, 1:29.**

**Third quarter**

- JAX – Josh Lambo 53-yard field goal, 5:46. Buccaneers 25–3. **Drive: 7 plays, 26 yards, 3:29.**

**Fourth quarter**

- JAX – Dede Westbrook 3-yard pass from Gardner Minshew (Gardner Minshew–Dede Westbrook pass), 13:37. Buccaneers 25–11. **Drive: 4 plays, 54 yards, 1:28.**
- TB – Matt Gay 37-yard field goal, 2:19. Buccaneers 28–11. **Drive: 4 plays, 5 yards, 0:58.**

**Top passers**

- TB – Jameis Winston – 21/33, 268 yards
- JAX – Gardner Minshew – 16/27, 147 yards, TD, INT

**Top rushers**

- TB – Peyton Barber – 17 rushes, 44 yards, 2 TD
- JAX – Leonard Fournette – 14 rushes, 38 yards

**Top receivers**

- TB – Breshad Perriman – 5 receptions, 87 yards
- JAX – Dede Westbrook – 5 receptions, 60 yards, TD

Running back Peyton Barber had 2 rushing touchdowns as the Buccaneers' defense continued their strong level of play for the second consecutive week, sacking quarterbacks Nick Foles and Gardner Minshew a combined 5 times, intercepting 2 passes, forcing 3 fumbles, and recovering 2 of them with 1 returned for a touchdown by Devin White.

==== Week 14: vs. Indianapolis Colts ====
Week Fourteen: Indianapolis Colts at Tampa Bay Buccaneers – Game summary

Quarter	1	2	3	4	Total
Colts	10	17	8	0	**35**
**Buccaneers**	14	7	7	10	**38**

at Raymond James Stadium, Tampa, Florida

- Date: December 8
- Game time: 1:00 p.m. EST
- Game weather: Cloudy, 78 °F (26 °C)
- Game attendance: 50,232
- Referee: Tony Corrente
- TV announcers (CBS): Spero Dedes and Adam Archuleta
- Recap, Game Book

Game information

**First quarter**

- IND – Marcus Johnson 46-yard pass from Jacoby Brissett (Chase McLaughlin kick), 12:45. Colts 7–0. **Drive: 3 plays, 50 yards, 1:33.**
- IND – Chase McLaughlin 50-yard field goal, 6:53. Colts 10–0. **Drive: 7 plays, 16 yards, 2:41.**
- TB – Jameis Winston 1-yard run (Matt Gay kick), 1:41. Colts 10–7. **Drive: 10 plays, 75 yards, 5:12.**
- TB – Mike Evans 61-yard pass from Jameis Winston (Matt Gay kick), 1:06. Buccaneers 14–10. **Drive: 1 play, 61 yards, 0:09.**

**Second quarter**

- IND – Marlon Mack 2-yard run (Chase McLaughlin kick), 7:42. Colts 17–14. **Drive: 10 plays, 47 yards, 4:52.**
- IND – Shaquille Leonard 80-yard interception return (Chase McLaughlin kick), 2:32. Colts 24–14.
- TB – Cameron Brate 3-yard pass from Jameis Winston (Matt Gay kick), 0:38. Colts 24–21. **Drive: 11 plays, 75 yards, 1:54.**
- IND – Chase McLaughlin 19-yard field goal, 0:00. Colts 27–21. **Drive: 6 plays, 74 yards, 0:38.**

**Third quarter**

- IND – Zach Pascal 12-yard pass from Jacoby Brissett (Jacoby Brissett–Zach Pascal pass), 5:59. Colts 35–21. **Drive: 7 plays, 76 yards, 3:34.**
- TB – Justin Watson 17-yard pass from Jameis Winston (Matt Gay kick), 3:18. Colts 35–28. **Drive: 5 plays, 75 yards, 2:41.**

**Fourth quarter**

- TB – Matt Gay 44-yard field goal, 13:00. Colts 35–31. **Drive: 10 plays, 55 yards, 3:43.**
- TB – Breshad Perriman 12-yard pass from Jameis Winston (Matt Gay kick), 3:51. Buccaneers 38–35. **Drive: 8 plays, 63 yards, 4:22.**

**Top passers**

- IND – Jacoby Brissett – 19/36, 251 yards, 2 TD
- TB – Jameis Winston – 33/45, 456 yards, 4 TD, 3 INT

**Top rushers**

- IND – Marlon Mack – 13 rushes, 38 yards, TD
- TB – Ronald Jones – 11 rushes, 36 yards

**Top receivers**

- IND – Marcus Johnson – 3 receptions, 105 yards, TD
- TB – Chris Godwin – 7 receptions, 91 yards

The Buccaneers overcame 4 turnovers and a 14-point deficit to defeat the Colts 38-35 en route to their first 3-game winning streak since 2016. Jameis Winston set a career best and Buccaneers single game record for the most passing yards in a home game with 461 total yards (456 passing, 5 rushing), 5 total touchdowns (4 passing, 1 rushing), and 3 interceptions (one returned for a touchdown). Winston also broke the franchise record for passing yards in a single season that he set in 2016. Despite the win, which improved the team to 6–7, Tampa Bay was eliminated from postseason contention for the 12th year in a row after the Minnesota Vikings also won that day. This would be the last time they failed to qualify for the playoff until 2025.

==== Week 15: at Detroit Lions ====
Week Fifteen: Tampa Bay Buccaneers at Detroit Lions – Game summary

Quarter	1	2	3	4	Total
**Buccaneers**	14	7	3	14	**38**
Lions	0	3	7	7	**17**

at Ford Field, Detroit, Michigan

- Date: December 15
- Game time: 1:00 p.m. EST
- Game weather: None (indoor stadium)
- Game attendance: 56,515
- Referee: Adrian Hill
- TV announcers (Fox): Dick Stockton, Mark Schlereth and Jennifer Hale
- Recap, Game Book

Game information

**First quarter**

- TB – Breshad Perriman 34-yard pass from Jameis Winston (Matt Gay kick), 7:30. Buccaneers 7–0. **Drive: 8 plays, 79 yards, 4:19.**
- TB – Scotty Miller 33-yard pass from Jameis Winston (Matt Gay kick), 3:49. Buccaneers 14–0. **Drive: 5 plays, 99 yards, 1:52.**

**Second quarter**

- TB – Breshad Perriman 25-yard pass from Jameis Winston (Matt Gay kick), 8:19. Buccaneers 21–0. **Drive: 9 plays, 72 yards, 4:27.**
- DET – Matt Prater 44-yard field goal, 3:21. Buccaneers 21–3. **Drive: 11 plays, 49 yards, 4:56.**

**Third quarter**

- TB – Matt Gay 46-yard field goal, 11:36. Buccaneers 24–3. **Drive: 5 plays, 39 yards, 1:29.**
- DET – Wes Hills 1-yard run (Matt Prater kick), 6:49. Buccaneers 24–10. **Drive: 11 plays, 80 yards, 4:47.**

**Fourth quarter**

- DET – Wes Hills 1-yard run (Matt Prater kick), 15:00. Buccaneers 24–17. **Drive: 7 plays, 87 yards, 2:57.**
- TB – Sean Murphy-Bunting 70-yard interception return (Matt Gay kick), 5:23. Buccaneers 31–17.
- TB – Breshad Perriman 25-yard pass from Jameis Winston (Matt Gay kick), 3:04. Buccaneers 38–17. **Drive: 5 plays, 46 yards, 1:05.**

**Top passers**

- TB – Jameis Winston – 28/42, 458 yards, 4 TD, 1 INT
- DET – David Blough – 24/43, 260 yards, 2 INT

**Top rushers**

- TB – Ronald Jones – 11 rushes, 23 yards
- DET – Wes Hills – 10 rushes, 21 yards, 2 TD

**Top receivers**

- TB – Chris Godwin – 5 receptions, 121 yards
- DET – Danny Amendola – 8 receptions, 101 yards

Jameis Winston became the first player in NFL history to have consecutive games of 450 yards passing as he threw for a career best 458 yards, 4 touchdowns, and 1 interception en route to breaking the franchise record for touchdown passes in a season that he set in 2016 with his 30th and the Buccaneers won their 4th straight game. Breshad Perriman set career bests in receiving yards and touchdowns as he caught 5 passes for 113 yards and 3 touchdowns. Shaquil Barrett tied the franchise record for sacks set by Warren Sapp in 2000 with 16.5.

==== Week 16: vs. Houston Texans ====
Week Sixteen: Houston Texans at Tampa Bay Buccaneers – Game summary

Quarter	1	2	3	4	Total
**Texans**	10	7	3	3	**23**
Buccaneers	3	14	3	0	**20**

at Raymond James Stadium, Tampa, Florida

- Date: December 21
- Game time: 1:00 p.m. EST
- Game weather: Cloudy, 73 °F (23 °C)
- Game attendance: 49,036
- Referee: Scott Novak
- TV announcers (NFLN): Rich Eisen, Nate Burleson, Joe Thomas and Melissa Stark
- Recap, Game Book

Game information

**First quarter**

- HOU – Bradley Roby 27-yard interception return (Kaʻimi Fairbairn kick), 14:12. Texans 7–0.
- HOU – Kaʻimi Fairbairn 32-yard field goal, 11:29. Texans 10–0. **Drive: 6 plays. 10 yards, 1:40.**
- TB – Matt Gay 50-yard field goal, 0:56. Texans 10–3. **Drive: 9 plays, 58 yards, 3:42.**

**Second quarter**

- HOU – Carlos Hyde 1-yard run (Kaʻimi Fairbairn kick), 9:22. Texans 17–3. **Drive: 7 plays, 42 yards, 2:54.**
- TB – Ronald Jones 4-yard run (Matt Gay kick), 1:57. Texans 17–10. **Drive: 9 plays, 81 yards, 3:16.**
- TB – Justin Watson 8-yard pass from Jameis Winston (Matt Gay kick), 0:13. Tied 17–17. **Drive: 5 plays, 39 yards, 0:29.**

**Third quarter**

- HOU – Kaʻimi Fairbairn 25-yard field goal, 9:30. Texans 20–17. **Drive: 14 plays, 68 yards, 5:30.**
- TB – Matt Gay 41-yard field goal, 1:13. Tied 20–20. **Drive: 16 plays, 57 yards, 8:17.**

**Fourth quarter**

- HOU – Kaʻimi Fairbairn 37-yard field goal, 7:11. Texans 23–20. **Drive: 10 plays, 69 yards, 4:50.**

**Top passers**

- HOU – Deshaun Watson – 19/32, 184 yards, INT
- TB – Jameis Winston – 25/48, 335 yards, TD, 4 INT

**Top rushers**

- HOU – Deshaun Watson – 7 rushes, 37 yards
- TB – Ronald Jones – 14 rushes, 77 yards, TD

**Top receivers**

- HOU – Kenny Stills – 5 receptions, 57 yards
- TB – Breshad Perriman – 7 receptions, 102 yards

Jameis Winston threw four interceptions, including a pick 6 on the second play of the game. The Buccaneers committed five turnovers, but managed to tie the game at 20–20 late in the third quarter. Houston kicked a field goal with 7:11 remaining, and held on to win 23–20.

==== Week 17: vs. Atlanta Falcons ====
Week Seventeen: Atlanta Falcons at Tampa Bay Buccaneers – Game summary

Quarter	1	2	3	4	OT	Total
**Falcons**	10	6	0	6	6	**28**
Buccaneers	0	22	0	0	0	**22**

at Raymond James Stadium, Tampa, Florida

- Date: December 29
- Game time: 1:00 p.m. EST
- Game weather: Cloudy, 78 °F (26 °C)
- Game attendance: 50,417
- Referee: Carl Cheffers
- TV announcers (Fox): Tim Brando, Matt Millen and Sara Walsh
- Recap, Game Book

Game information

**First quarter**

- ATL - Ty Sambrailo 35-yard pass from Matt Ryan (Younghoe Koo kick), 10:33. Falcons 7-0. **Drive: 7 plays, 75 yards, 4:27.**
- ATL - Younghoe Koo 27-yard field goal, 6:55. Falcons 10-0. **Drive: 7 plays, 20 yards, 3:23.**

**Second quarter**

- TB - Cameron Brate 2-yard pass from Jameis Winston (Matt Gay kick), 10:23. Falcons 10-7. **Drive: 9 plays, 67 yards, 5:15.**
- ATL - Younghoe Koo 33-yard field goal, 5:20. Falcons 13-7. **Drive: 13 plays, 60 yards, 5:03.**
- TB - Devin White 91-yard fumble return (Matt Gay kick), 3:07. Buccaneers 14-13.
- ATL - Younghoe Koo 45-yard field goal, 0:58. Falcons 16-14. **Drive: 9 plays, 48 yards, 2:09.**
- TB - Breshad Perriman 24-yard pass from Jameis Winston (Jameis Winston run), 0:11. Buccaneers 22-16. **Drive: 5 plays, 76 yards, 0:47.**

**Third quarter**

- No scoring plays.

**Fourth quarter**

- ATL - Younghoe Koo 43-yard field goal, 6:27. Buccaneers 22-19. **Drive: 9 plays, 37 yards, 3:19.**
- ATL - Younghoe Koo 33-yard field goal, 0:00. Tied 22-22. **Drive: 14 plays, 65 yards, 3:01.**

**Overtime**

- ATL - Deion Jones 27-yard interception return, 9:53. Falcons 28-22.

**Top passers**

- ATL – Matt Ryan – 30/51, 313 yards, TD
- TB – Jameis Winston – 13/24, 201 yards, 2 TD, 2 INT

**Top rushers**

- ATL – Devonta Freeman – 18 rushes, 58 yards
- TB – Ronald Jones – 11 rushes, 106 yards

**Top receivers**

- ATL – Julio Jones – 7 receptions, 78 yards
- TB – Breshad Perriman – 5 receptions, 134 yards, TD

Atlanta's Younghoe Koo kicked a 33-yard field goal as time expired in regulation, sending the game to overtime. On the first play of the overtime period, Jameis Winston threw a pick-6 interception. Deion Jones returned the ball 27 yards for the touchdown to win the game for Atlanta, in the shortest overtime game in NFL history (7 seconds). It was Winston's final game with Tampa Bay, and his first pass attempt (2015) and last pass attempt were both pick 6s.

== Standings ==
=== Division ===
NFC South
	W	L	T	PCT	DIV	CONF	PF	PA	STK
^{(3)} New Orleans Saints	13	3	0	.813	5–1	9–3	458	341	W3
Atlanta Falcons	7	9	0	.438	4–2	6–6	381	399	W4
Tampa Bay Buccaneers	7	9	0	.438	2–4	5–7	458	449	L2
Carolina Panthers	5	11	0	.313	1–5	2–10	340	470	L8

=== Conference ===
NFC
#	Team	Division	W	L	T	PCT	DIV	CONF	SOS	SOV	STK
Division leaders
1 (Note: San Francisco finished ahead of Green Bay and New Orleans based on head-to-head sweep, claiming the No. 1 seed.)	San Francisco 49ers	West	13	3	0	.813	5–1	10–2	.504	.466	W2
2 (Note: Green Bay claimed the No. 2 seed over New Orleans based on conference record.)	Green Bay Packers	North	13	3	0	.813	6–0	10–2	.453	.428	W5
3	New Orleans Saints	South	13	3	0	.813	5–1	9–3	.486	.459	W3
4	Philadelphia Eagles	East	9	7	0	.563	5–1	7–5	.455	.417	W4
Wild Cards
5	Seattle Seahawks	West	11	5	0	.688	3–3	8–4	.531	.463	L2
6	Minnesota Vikings	North	10	6	0	.625	2–4	7–5	.477	.356	L2
Did not qualify for the postseason
7	Los Angeles Rams	West	9	7	0	.563	3–3	7–5	.535	.438	W1
8 (Note: Chicago finished ahead of Dallas based on head-to-head victory.)	Chicago Bears	North	8	8	0	.500	4–2	7–5	.508	.383	W1
9	Dallas Cowboys	East	8	8	0	.500	5–1	7–5	.479	.316	W1
10 (Note: Atlanta finished ahead of Tampa Bay based on division record.)	Atlanta Falcons	South	7	9	0	.438	4–2	6–6	.545	.518	W4
11	Tampa Bay Buccaneers	South	7	9	0	.438	2–4	5–7	.500	.384	L2
12	Arizona Cardinals	West	5	10	1	.344	1–5	3–8–1	.529	.375	L1
13	Carolina Panthers	South	5	11	0	.313	1–5	2–10	.549	.469	L8
14	New York Giants	East	4	12	0	.250	2–4	3–9	.473	.281	L1
15	Detroit Lions	North	3	12	1	.219	0–6	2–9–1	.506	.375	L9
16	Washington Redskins	East	3	13	0	.188	0–6	2–10	.502	.281	L4
Tiebreakers (Note: When breaking ties for three or more teams under the NFL's rules, they are first broken within divisions, then comparing only the highest-ranked remaining team from each division.)
