= Marcus Johnson (wide receiver) =

American football player (born 1994)

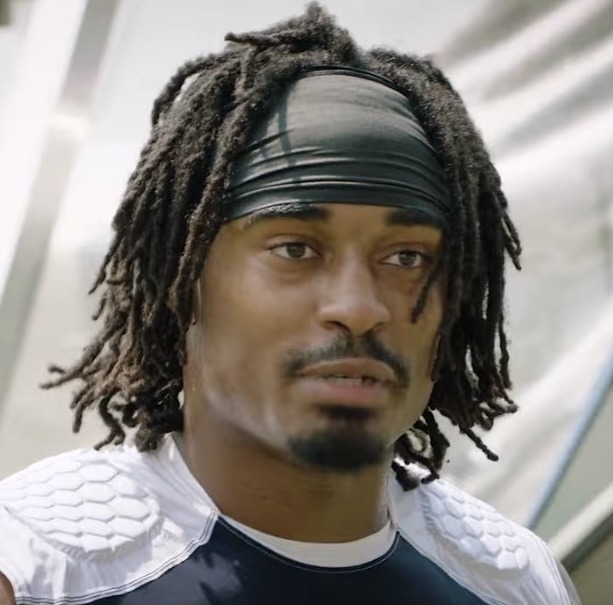
- Johnson with the Tennessee Titans in 2021

No. 14, 16, 83, 88, 84, 87
- Position: Wide receiver

Personal information
- Born: August 5, 1994 (age 32); League City, Texas, U.S.
- Listed height: 6 ft 1 in (1.85 m)
- Listed weight: 207 lb (94 kg)

Career information
- High school: Clear Springs (League City)
- College: Texas
- NFL draft: 2016: undrafted

Career history
- Philadelphia Eagles (2016–2017); Seattle Seahawks (2018)*; Indianapolis Colts (2018–2020); Tennessee Titans (2020–2021); San Francisco 49ers (2022)*; New York Giants (2022)
- * Offseason or practice squad member only

Awards and highlights
- Super Bowl champion (LII)

Career NFL statistics
- Receptions: 60
- Receiving yards: 938
- Receiving touchdowns: 3
- Stats at Pro Football Reference

Marcus Johnson (born August 5, 1994) is an American former professional football player who was a wide receiver for six seasons in the National Football League (NFL) for four different teams and won a Super Bowl ring with the Philadelphia Eagles following Super Bowl LII. After playing college football for the Texas Longhorns, he was signed by the Eagles as an undrafted free agent following the 2016 NFL draft and spent part of the season on the practice squad before making the roster the next year. He also played for the Tennessee Titans, Indianapolis Colts and New York Giants.

== Early life ==
Johnson played high school football at Clear Springs High School where he was an all-state player at wide receiver and kick returner and also lettered in track.

== College career ==
Johnson played college football at the University of Texas. He started in 18 of 42 total games played during his time at UT. During Spring 2014, Johnson was a member of the Big 12 Commissioner's Honor Roll. While at UT, Johnson was a physical culture and sports major with a career interest in either physical therapy or sports medicine.

=== College statistics ===
Season	Team	Conf	Class	Pos	GP	Rec	Yds	Avg	TD
2013	Texas	Big 12	SO	WR	9	22	350	15.9	2
2014	Texas	Big 12	JR	WR	13	27	313	11.6	1
2015	Texas	Big 12	SR	WR	6	12	130	10.8	1
Career					28	61	793	13.0	4

== Professional career ==
Pre-draft measurables
Height	Weight	Arm length	Hand span	Wingspan	40-yard dash	10-yard split	20-yard split	20-yard shuttle	Three-cone drill	Vertical jump	Broad jump	Bench press
6 ft 0 7/8 in (1.85 m)	204 lb (93 kg)	31 7/8 in (0.81 m)	9 1/4 in (0.23 m)	6 ft 3 5/8 in (1.92 m)	4.39 s	1.53 s	2.48 s	4.39 s	7.26 s	37 in (0.94 m)	11 ft 3 in (3.43 m)	22 reps
All values from Texas Pro Day on March 23, 2016.

=== Philadelphia Eagles ===
Johnson signed with the Philadelphia Eagles as an undrafted free agent on May 5, 2016. He suffered a quadriceps injury early in training camp that caused him to miss most of the practices. He was waived during final roster cuts on September 3, but was re-signed to the team's practice squad the next day. He was released by the Eagles on September 13, but was later re-signed back to their practice squad on December 2. He signed a reserve/future contract with the Eagles on January 2, 2017.

After impressing coaches during training camp in 2017, Johnson made the 53-man roster on September 2. In Week 5 against the Arizona Cardinals, he recorded his first career catch: a six-yard reception. Johnson was a member of the Eagles' Super Bowl LII Championship team after defeating the New England Patriots 41–33. However, he was inactive in that game, including all other post-season games that year, as well as five of the six final games of the season.

=== Seattle Seahawks ===
On March 7, 2018, Johnson and a 2018 fifth-round draft pick were traded to the Seattle Seahawks in exchange for Michael Bennett and a 2018 seventh-round draft pick. The trade became official on March 14, 2018, at the start of the new league year.

=== Indianapolis Colts ===
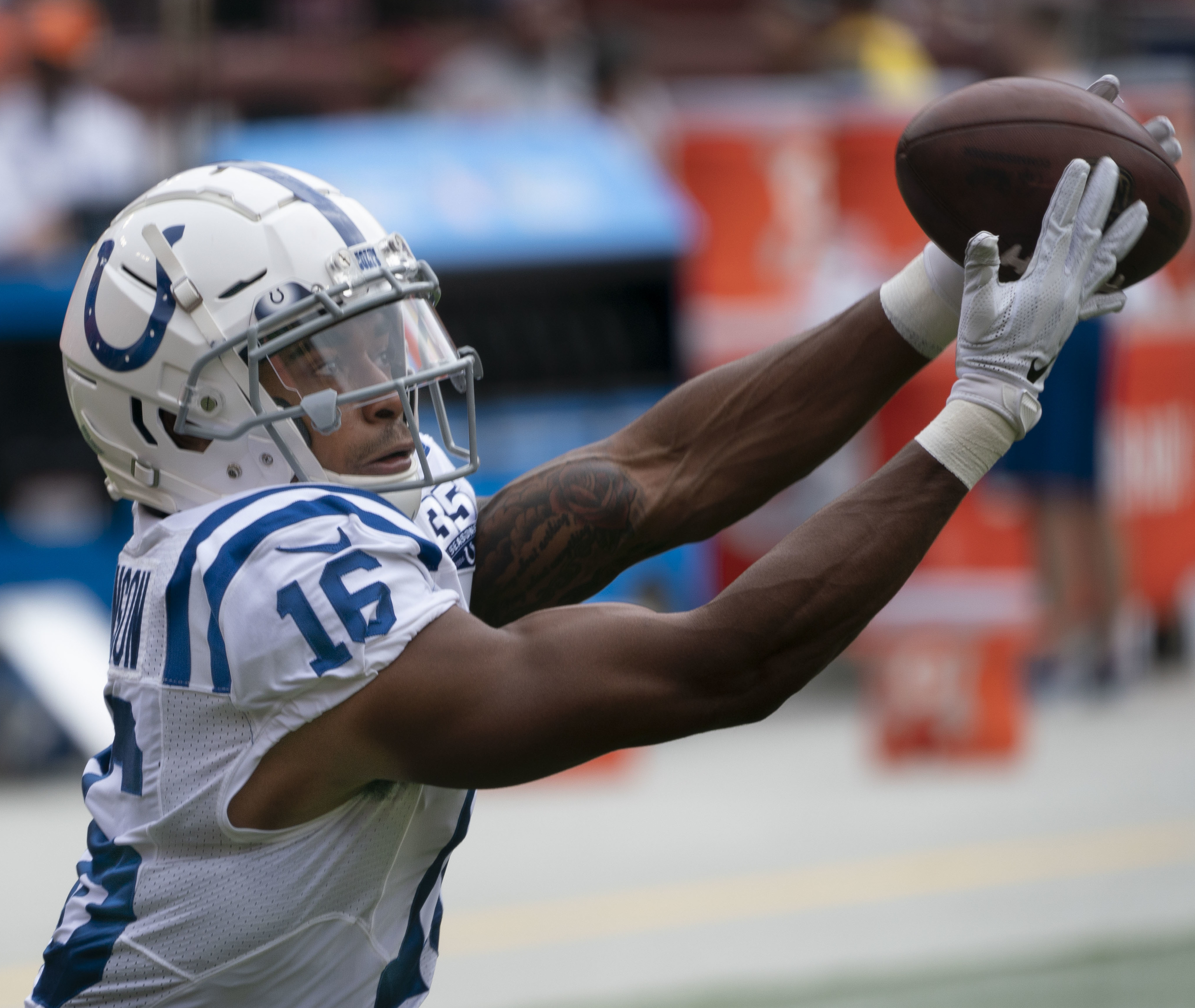
Johnson with the Indianapolis Colts in 2018

On September 1, 2018, Johnson was traded to the Indianapolis Colts for tight end Darrell Daniels. In Week 6 against the New York Jets, he scored his first professional touchdown. He was placed on injured reserve on October 16, causing the Colts to sign Dontrelle Inman, after suffering an ankle injury in that game.

Johnson was waived/injured during final roster cuts on August 31, 2019, and reverted to the team's injured reserve list the next day. He was waived from injured reserve with an injury settlement on September 9. On October 1, Johnson was re-signed to the Colts' practice squad. He was promoted to the active roster on November 9 and played his first career start on November 17 against the Jacksonville Jaguars. In Week 14 against the Tampa Bay Buccaneers, Johnson caught three passes for 105 yards, including a 46-yard touchdown, in a 38–35 loss. This season had been his most productive so far, catching 17 passes for 277 yards and 2 TD's.

On April 22, 2020, Johnson was re-signed to a one-year contract. He was waived on September 5. On September 23, Johnson was signed to the practice squad. He was elevated to the active roster on October 3 for a Week 4 game against the Chicago Bears, but reverted to the practice squad afterwards. He was again promoted to the active roster on October 10, for their Week 5 game against the Cleveland Browns, and again reverted to the practice squad. For the third consecutive week, he was promoted to the active roster on October 17. In their Week 6 game against the Cincinnati Bengals, he recorded a career-high 108 receiving yards, where the Colts achieved a 31–27 victory. On January 2, 2021, Johnson was waived by the Colts.

=== Tennessee Titans ===
On January 6, 2021, Johnson signed to the Tennessee Titans' practice squad. His practice squad contract with the team expired after the season ended on January 18. He re-signed with the Titans on March 9. Johnson was placed on injured reserve on September 2, just after earning a spot on the 53-man roster. He was activated on October 9, and placed on injured reserve again on November 23 after a hamstring injury while facing the Houston Texans. This effectively ended his season. As a Titan, he played in 7 games, starting in 3, and recorded 9 catches for 160 yards.

=== San Francisco 49ers ===
On April 11, 2022, the San Francisco 49ers signed Johnson. He was released on August 30.

=== New York Giants ===
On September 6, 2022, Johnson was signed to the New York Giants practice squad. Johnson was elevated from the practice squad for their Week 4 game against the Chicago Bears, and again for their Week 5 game against the Green Bay Packers. On October 15, he was elevated from the practice squad for the third time that season for their Week 6 game against the Baltimore Ravens. Because the Giants had elevated him from the practice squad for the maximum of three times that season, they officially signed Johnson off the practice squad on October 18. He finished the season starting a career-high seven games, while playing in 14 games, with 9 catches for 99 yards, including a 17-yard catch in his first career post-season game.

He had signed a 1-year, $1,035,000 contract with the Giants for the 2022 season, and became an unrestricted free agent the following year.

== NFL career statistics ==
Year	Team	Games		Receiving					Rushing					Fumbles	
Year	Team	GP	GS	Rec	Yds	Avg	Lng	TD	Att	Yds	Avg	Lng	TD	Fum	Lost
2017	PHI	10	0	5	45	9.0	16	0	1	-2	-2.0	0	0	1	0
2018	IND	5	0	6	102	17.0	34	1	0	0	0.0	0	0	0	0
2019	IND	8	6	17	277	16.3	50	2	0	0	0.0	0	0	0	0
2020	IND	11	3	14	255	18.2	55	0	0	0	0.0	0	0	0	0
2021	TEN	7	3	9	160	17.8	50	0	2	-2	-1.0	0	0	0	0
2022	NYG	14	7	9	99	11.0	18	0	0	0	0.0	0	0	0	0
Career		55	19	60	938	15.6	55	3	3	-4	-1.3	0	0	1	0

== Personal life ==
Johnson's father Morlon, played college basketball at Prairie View A&M. Johnson's hobbies include listening to music and playing video games.
