= 2019 Indianapolis Colts season =

67th season in franchise history

- Owner: Jim Irsay
- General manager: Chris Ballard
- Head coach: Frank Reich
- Home stadium: Lucas Oil Stadium

Results
- Record: 7–9
- Division place: 3rd AFC South
- Playoffs: Did not qualify
- All-Pros: G Quenton Nelson (1st team); LB Shaquille Leonard (2nd team)
- Pro Bowlers: OLB Shaquille Leonard; G Quenton Nelson; C Ryan Kelly; TE Jack Doyle

Uniform
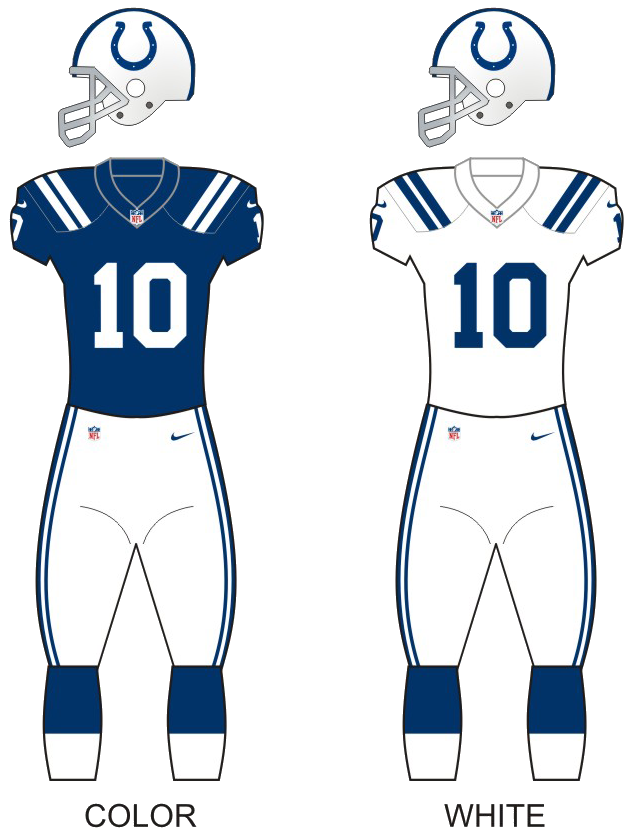

The 2019 season was the Indianapolis Colts' 67th in the National Football League (NFL), their 36th in Indianapolis, and their 12th playing their home games at Lucas Oil Stadium. It was also their second season under head coach Frank Reich and third under the leadership of general manager Chris Ballard.

For the first time since 2011, quarterback Andrew Luck was not on the roster, as he announced his retirement on August 24, 2019. A four-time Pro Bowler and the top pick in the 2012 draft, Luck led the Colts to four playoff appearances (2012–2014, 2018), an appearance in the AFC Championship Game in the 2014 season (the franchise's only time doing so in the post-Peyton Manning era), and won the NFL Comeback Player of the Year award in 2018. A four-year cycle of injuries and rehab that dated back to 2015 had "taken his joy of this game away," which led to his decision of retiring. This would also mark kicker Adam Vinatieri's last season in the NFL, after playing 24 years in the league, as he would spend the entire 2020 season in free agency before retiring on May 26, 2021. A four-time Super Bowl champion with the Colts and New England Patriots, Vinatieri is considered one of the greatest kickers of all time and made memorable game-winning plays with the Patriots in games such as the Tuck Rule Game and Super Bowls XXXVI and XXXVIII. Vinatieri was also the last remaining active player whose career began in the 1990s.

Despite a strong 5–2 start, the Colts would suffer a late-season collapse, losing 7 of their next 9 games, and were eliminated from playoff contention after a Week 15 loss to the New Orleans Saints. This was partially a result of injuries to key skill players such as QB Jacoby Brissett, WR T. Y. Hilton, RB Marlon Mack and TE Eric Ebron. They also failed to improve or match their 10–6 record from the previous season.

Despite the disappointing season, the Colts managed to defeat the eventual Super Bowl champions the Kansas City Chiefs and limit the Chiefs offense to only 13 points, which at the time was the fewest points allowed to the Chiefs since Patrick Mahomes became the starter.

== Draft ==
2019 Indianapolis Colts Draft
Round	Selection	Player	Position	College	Notes
2	34	Rock Ya-Sin	CB	Temple	From New York Jets
2	49	Ben Banogu	LB	TCU	From Cleveland Browns
2	59	Parris Campbell	WR	Ohio State	
3	89	Bobby Okereke	LB	Stanford	
4	109	Khari Willis	S	Michigan State	
5	144	Marvell Tell	S	USC	From Cleveland Browns
5	164	E. J. Speed	LB	Tarleton State	
6	199	Gerri Green	DE	Mississippi State	
7	240	Jackson Barton	T	Utah	
7	246	Javon Patterson	C	Ole Miss	

Notes

- Because the Colts lost more compensatory free agents than they signed during the 2018 free agency period, the team was awarded one compensatory selection in the fourth round of the 2019 draft.
- The Colts acquired the Raiders' fourth-round pick (109th) in exchange for their two fourth-round picks (129th and 135th)

== Staff ==
2019 Indianapolis Colts staff
Front office: Owner – Jim Irsay; General manager – Chris Ballard; Assistant general manager – Ed Dodds; Vice president of player personnel – Vacant; Director of football administration – Mike Bluem; Director of pro personnel – Kevin Rogers Jr.; Director of college scouting – Morocco Brown; Assistant director of pro scouting – Jon Shaw; Assistant director of college scouting – Matt Tarpening; Senior player personnel scout – Todd Vasvari; Director of player development – Brian Decker; Head coaches: Head coach – Frank Reich; Offensive coaches: Offensive coordinator – Nick Sirianni; Quarterbacks – Marcus Brady; Running backs – Tom Rathman; Wide receivers – Kevin Patullo; Tight ends – Jason Michael; Offensive line – Chris Strausser; Assistant offensive line – Klayton Adams; Senior offensive assistant – Howard Mudd; Offensive quality control – Gunnard Twyner	Defensive coaches: Defensive coordinator – Matt Eberflus; Defensive line – Mike Phair; Linebackers – Dave Borgonzi; Defensive backs/cornerbacks – Jonathan Gannon; Defensive backs/safeties – Alan Williams; Defensive quality control – David Overstreet II; Special teams coaches: Special teams coordinator – Bubba Ventrone; Assistant special teams – Franky Ross; Strength and conditioning: Director of sports performance – Rusty Jones; Sports science/conditioning – Ryan Podell; Head strength and conditioning – Richard Howell; Assistant strength and conditioning – Doug McKenney; Assistant strength and conditioning – Zane Fakes

== Final roster ==
2019 Indianapolis Colts roster
Quarterbacks (QB): 7 Jacoby Brissett; 2 Brian Hoyer; 6 Chad Kelly; Running backs (RB): 21 Nyheim Hines; 25 Marlon Mack; 20 Jordan Wilkins; 33 Jonathan Williams; Wide receivers (WR): 16 Ashton Dulin; 13 T. Y. Hilton; 86 Dontrelle Inman; 83 Marcus Johnson; 14 Zach Pascal; 11 Chad Williams; Tight ends (TE): 81 Mo Alie-Cox; 84 Jack Doyle	Offensive linemen (OL): 63 Josh Andrews C/G; 74 Anthony Castonzo T; 62 Le'Raven Clark T; 60 Jake Eldrenkamp G; 64 Mark Glowinski G; 73 Joe Haeg T/G; 78 Ryan Kelly C; 56 Quenton Nelson G; 72 Braden Smith T; Defensive linemen (DL): 96 Denico Autry DT; 52 Ben Banogu DE; 91 Trevon Coley DT; 92 Margus Hunt DT; 99 Justin Houston DE; 94 Tyquan Lewis DE; 97 Al-Quadin Muhammad DE; 93 Jabaal Sheard DE; 90 Grover Stewart DT	Linebackers (LB): 49 Matthew Adams OLB; 44 Zaire Franklin MLB; 53 Shaquille Leonard OLB; 55 Skai Moore OLB; 58 Bobby Okereke OLB; 45 E. J. Speed OLB; 50 Anthony Walker MLB; Defensive backs (DB): 28 Briean Boddy-Calhoun CB; 35 Pierre Desir CB; 26 Clayton Geathers SS; 29 Malik Hooker FS; 23 Kenny Moore CB; 30 George Odum FS; 39 Marvell Tell CB; 37 Khari Willis S; 31 Quincy Wilson CB; 34 Rock Ya-Sin CB; Special teams (ST): 5 Chase McLaughlin K; 8 Rigoberto Sanchez P; 46 Luke Rhodes LS	Practice squad: 48 Ian Bunting TE; 95 Gerri Green DE; 9 Malik Henry WR; 68 Cedrick Lang T; 32 Picasso Nelson, Jr. CB; 36 Jackson Porter CB; 67 Travis Vornkahl T; 76 Roderick Young DT; Reserve: -- Billy Brown TE (IR); 15 Parris Campbell WR (IR); 85 Eric Ebron TE (IR); 10 Daurice Fountain WR (IR); 17 Devin Funchess WR (IR); -- Steve Ishmael WR (IR); 79 Jegs Jegede DE (IR); 27 Isaiah Johnson FS (IR); 42 Rolan Milligan SS (IR); -- Kai Nacua FS (IR); 65 Javon Patterson C (IR); 80 Chester Rogers WR (IR); 57 Kemoko Turay DE (IR); 4 Adam Vinatieri K (IR); Rookies in italics 53 active, 14 reserve, 8 practice squad

== Preseason ==
The team was rocked by the decision August 24 by starting quarterback Andrew Luck that he would immediately retire from professional football due to chronic injury problems and the emotional and mental strain they had extracted. Luck, the 2018 NFL Comeback Player of the Year, had been battling a mysterious and slow-healing leg injury, described by the team variously as a "calf strain" and a "high ankle issue."

Luck, a 7-year professional with four appearances in the NFL Pro Bowl, indicated that he had been contemplating leaving the game for a week-and-a-half or two weeks prior to his announcement; he had been speaking with team officials about the matter all week. In a news conference Luck indicated that his recurring injuries had "taken my joy of this game away.... After 2016, I played in pain and was unable to practice, I said I wouldn't go through that again."

The team moved forward with former New England Patriots backup Jacoby Brissett, a third-year Colt, as its designated starting quarterback.

Week	Date	Opponent	Result	Record	Venue	Recap
1	August 8	at Buffalo Bills	L 16–24	0–1	New Era Field	Recap
2	August 17	Cleveland Browns	L 18–21	0–2	Lucas Oil Stadium	Recap
3	August 24	Chicago Bears	L 17–27	0–3	Lucas Oil Stadium	Recap
4	August 29	at Cincinnati Bengals	W 13–6	1–3	Paul Brown Stadium	Recap

== Regular season ==
=== Schedule ===
Week	Date	Opponent	Result	Record	Venue	Recap
1	September 8	at Los Angeles Chargers	**L** 24–30 (OT)	0–1	Dignity Health Sports Park	Recap
2	September 15	at **Tennessee Titans**	**W** 19–17	1–1	Nissan Stadium	Recap
3	September 22	Atlanta Falcons	**W** 27–24	2–1	Lucas Oil Stadium	Recap
4	September 29	Oakland Raiders	**L** 24–31	2–2	Lucas Oil Stadium	Recap
5	October 6	at Kansas City Chiefs	**W** 19–13	3–2	Arrowhead Stadium	Recap
6	Bye					
7	October 20	**Houston Texans**	**W** 30–23	4–2	Lucas Oil Stadium	Recap
8	October 27	Denver Broncos	**W** 15–13	5–2	Lucas Oil Stadium	Recap
9	November 3	at Pittsburgh Steelers	**L** 24–26	5–3	Heinz Field	Recap
10	November 10	Miami Dolphins	**L** 12–16	5–4	Lucas Oil Stadium	Recap
11	November 17	**Jacksonville Jaguars**	**W** 33–13	6–4	Lucas Oil Stadium	Recap
12	November 21	at **Houston Texans**	**L** 17–20	6–5	NRG Stadium	Recap
13	December 1	**Tennessee Titans**	**L** 17–31	6–6	Lucas Oil Stadium	Recap
14	December 8	at Tampa Bay Buccaneers	**L** 35–38	6–7	Raymond James Stadium	Recap
15	December 16	at New Orleans Saints	**L** 7–34	6–8	Mercedes-Benz Superdome	Recap
16	December 22	Carolina Panthers	**W** 38–6	7–8	Lucas Oil Stadium	Recap
17	December 29	at **Jacksonville Jaguars**	**L** 20–38	7–9	TIAA Bank Field	Recap

Note: Intra-division opponents are in bold text.

=== Game summaries ===
==== Week 1: at Los Angeles Chargers ====
Week One: Indianapolis Colts at Los Angeles Chargers – Game summary

Quarter	1	2	3	4	OT	Total
Colts	0	6	10	8	0	**24**
**Chargers**	7	10	7	0	6	**30**

at Dignity Health Sports Park, Carson, California

- Date: September 8
- Game time: 4:05 p.m. EDT/1:05 p.m. PDT
- Game weather: Sunny, 77 °F (25 °C)
- Game attendance: 25,363
- Referee: Shawn Smith
- TV announcers (CBS): Greg Gumbel, Trent Green and Melanie Collins
- Recap, Game Book

Game information

**First quarter**

- LAC – Austin Ekeler 1-yard pass from Philip Rivers (Ty Long kick), 2:55. Chargers 7–0. **Drive: 11 plays, 68 yards, 6:15.**

**Second quarter**

- IND – T. Y. Hilton 4-yard pass from Jacoby Brissett (kick failed, wide right), 10:02. Chargers 7–6. **Drive: 14 plays, 75 yards, 7:53.**
- LAC – Keenan Allen 28-yard pass from Philip Rivers (Ty Long kick), 5:58. Chargers 14–6. **Drive: 6 plays, 75 yards, 4:04.**
- LAC – Ty Long 40-yard field goal, 1:02. Chargers 17–6. **Drive: 10 plays, 24 yards, 3:17.**

**Third quarter**

- IND – Adam Vinatieri 44-yard field goal, 11:15. Chargers 17–9. **Drive: 8 plays, 49 yards, 3:45.**
- LAC – Austin Ekeler 55-yard pass from Philip Rivers (Ty Long kick), 8:27. Chargers 24–9. **Drive: 4 plays, 75 yards, 2:48.**
- IND – Marlon Mack 63-yard run (Adam Vinatieri kick), 7:40. Chargers 24–16. **Drive: 2 plays, 75 yards, 0:47.**

**Fourth quarter**

- IND – T. Y. Hilton 19-yard pass from Jacoby Brissett (Marlon Mack run), 0:38. Tied 24–24. **Drive: 16 plays, 80 yards, 7:52.**

**Overtime**

- LAC – Austin Ekeler 7-yard run, 5:01. Chargers 30–24. **Drive: 8 plays, 75 yards, 4:59.**

**Top passers**

- IND – Jacoby Brissett – 21/27, 190 yards, 2 TD
- LAC – Philip Rivers – 25/34, 333 yards, 3 TD, INT

**Top rushers**

- IND – Marlon Mack – 25 rushes, 174 yards, TD
- LAC – Austin Ekeler – 12 rushes, 58 yards, TD

**Top receivers**

- IND – T. Y. Hilton – 8 receptions, 87 yards, 2 TD
- LAC – Keenan Allen – 8 receptions, 123 yards, TD

==== Week 2: at Tennessee Titans ====
Week Two: Indianapolis Colts at Tennessee Titans – Game summary

Quarter	1	2	3	4	Total
**Colts**	7	6	0	6	**19**
Titans	0	7	10	0	**17**

at Nissan Stadium, Nashville, Tennessee

- Date: September 15
- Game time: 1:00 p.m. EDT/12:00 p.m. CDT
- Game weather: Sunny, 93 °F (34 °C)
- Game attendance: 62,849
- Referee: Clete Blakeman
- TV announcers (CBS): Spero Dedes and Adam Archuleta
- Recap, Game Book

Game information

**First quarter**

- IND – Eric Ebron 3-yard pass from Jacoby Brissett (Adam Vinatieri kick), 8:53. Colts 7–0. **Drive: 7 plays, 78 yards, 4:19.**

**Second quarter**

- TEN – David Quessenberry 1-yard pass from Marcus Mariota (Cairo Santos kick), 14:55. Tied 7–7. **Drive: 10 plays, 72 yards, 5:31.**
- IND – Parris Campbell 12-yard pass from Jacoby Brissett (kick failed, wide left), 8:00. Colts 13–7. **Drive: 12 plays, 73 yards, 6:55.**

**Third quarter**

- TEN – Derrick Henry 1-yard run (Cairo Santos kick), 11:31. Titans 14–13. **Drive: 4 plays, 40 yards, 1:38.**
- TEN – Cairo Santos 49-yard field goal, 4:35. Titans 17–13. **Drive: 5 plays, 14 yards, 2:39.**

**Fourth quarter**

- IND – T. Y. Hilton 4-yard pass from Jacoby Brissett (kick failed, hit right upright), 4:38. Colts 19–17. **Drive: 4 plays, 69 yards, 2:03.**

**Top passers**

- IND – Jacoby Brissett – 17/28, 146 yards, 3 TD, INT
- TEN – Marcus Mariota – 19/28, 154 yards, TD

**Top rushers**

- IND – Jordan Wilkins – 5 rushes, 82 yards
- TEN – Derrick Henry – 15 rushes, 81 yards, TD

**Top receivers**

- IND – T. Y. Hilton – 4 receptions, 43 yards, TD
- TEN – Delanie Walker – 4 receptions, 39 yards

==== Week 3: vs. Atlanta Falcons ====
Week Three: Atlanta Falcons at Indianapolis Colts – Game summary

Quarter	1	2	3	4	Total
Falcons	0	3	7	14	**24**
**Colts**	10	10	0	7	**27**

at Lucas Oil Stadium, Indianapolis, Indiana

- Date: September 22
- Game time: 1:00 p.m. EDT
- Game weather: None (retractable roof closed)
- Game attendance: 60,295
- Referee: Alex Kemp
- TV announcers (CBS): Andrew Catalon, James Lofton and AJ Ross
- Recap, Game Book

Game information

**First quarter**

- IND – Adam Vinatieri 49-yard field goal, 9:30. Colts 3–0. **Drive: 9 plays, 44 yards, 5:30.**
- IND – Zach Pascal 18-yard pass from Jacoby Brissett (Adam Vinatieri kick), 1:25. Colts 10–0. **Drive: 7 plays, 93 yards, 4:17.**

**Second quarter**

- IND – Adam Vinatieri 21-yard field goal, 5:51. Colts 13–0. **Drive: 15 plays, 94 yards, 8:20.**
- ATL – Matt Bryant 34-yard field goal, 2:20. Colts 13–3. **Drive: 9 plays, 59 yards, 3:31.**
- IND – T. Y. Hilton 4-yard pass from Jacoby Brissett (Adam Vinatieri kick), 0:09. Colts 20–3. **Drive: 10 plays, 64 yards, 2:11.**

**Third quarter**

- ATL – Austin Hooper 13-yard pass from Matt Ryan (Matt Bryant kick), 10:30. Colts 20–10. **Drive: 8 plays, 75 yards, 4:30.**

**Fourth quarter**

- ATL – Austin Hooper 2-yard pass from Matt Ryan (Matt Bryant kick), 13:51. Colts 20–17. **Drive: 16 plays, 78 yards, 9:56.**
- IND – Marlon Mack 4-yard run (Adam Vinatieri kick), 8:40. Colts 27–17. **Drive: 11 plays, 75 yards, 5:11.**
- ATL – Julio Jones 10-yard pass from Matt Ryan (Matt Bryant kick), 4:11. Colts 27–24. **Drive: 10 plays, 71 yards, 4:29.**

**Top passers**

- ATL – Matt Ryan – 29/34, 304 yards, 3 TD, INT
- IND – Jacoby Brissett – 28/37, 310 yards, 2 TD

**Top rushers**

- ATL – Devonta Freeman – 16 rushes, 88 yards
- IND – Marlon Mack – 16 rushes, 74 yards, TD

**Top receivers**

- ATL – Julio Jones – 8 receptions, 128 yards, TD
- IND – T. Y. Hilton – 8 receptions, 65 yards, TD

==== Week 4: vs. Oakland Raiders ====
Week Four: Oakland Raiders at Indianapolis Colts – Game summary

Quarter	1	2	3	4	Total
**Raiders**	14	7	3	7	**31**
Colts	7	3	0	14	**24**

at Lucas Oil Stadium, Indianapolis, Indiana

- Date: September 29
- Game time: 1:00 p.m. EDT
- Game weather: None (retractable roof closed)
- Game attendance: 62,259
- Referee: Scott Novak
- TV announcers (CBS): Kevin Harlan, Rich Gannon and John Schriffen
- Recap, Game Book

Game information

**First quarter**

- OAK – Foster Moreau 18-yard pass from Derek Carr (Daniel Carlson kick), 9:09. Raiders 7–0. **Drive: 10 plays, 75 yards, 5:51.**
- OAK – Trevor Davis 60-yard run (Daniel Carlson kick), 8:03. Raiders 14–0. **Drive: 1 play, 60 yards, 0:10.**
- IND – Jack Doyle 5-yard pass from Jacoby Brissett (Adam Vinatieri kick), 5:22. Raiders 14–7. **Drive: 3 plays, 22 yards, 1:14.**

**Second quarter**

- OAK – Tyrell Williams 19-yard pass from Derek Carr (Daniel Carlson kick), 14:13. Raiders 21–7. **Drive: 11 plays, 76 yards, 6:09.**
- IND – Adam Vinatieri 26-yard field goal, 7:33. Raiders 21–10. **Drive: 12 plays, 67 yards, 6:40.**

**Third quarter**

- OAK – Daniel Carlson 26-yard field goal, 3:14. Raiders 24–10. **Drive: 16 plays, 82 yards, 9:12.**

**Fourth quarter**

- IND – Chester Rogers 4-yard pass from Jacoby Brissett (Adam Vinatieri kick), 5:27. Raiders 24–17. **Drive: 14 plays, 90 yards, 4:54.**
- OAK – Erik Harris 30-yard interception return (Daniel Carlson kick), 2:09. Raiders 31–17.
- IND – Eric Ebron 48-yard pass from Jacoby Brissett (Adam Vinatieri kick), 1:10. Raiders 31–24. **Drive: 6 plays, 75 yards, 0:59.**

**Top passers**

- OAK – Derek Carr – 21/31, 189 yards, 2 TD
- IND – Jacoby Brissett – 24/46, 265 yards, 3 TD, INT

**Top rushers**

- OAK – Josh Jacobs – 17 rushes, 79 yards
- IND – Marlon Mack – 11 rushes, 39 yards

**Top receivers**

- OAK – Darren Waller – 7 receptions, 53 yards
- IND – Zach Pascal – 4 receptions, 72 yards

==== Week 5: at Kansas City Chiefs ====
Week Five: Indianapolis Colts at Kansas City Chiefs – Game summary

Quarter	1	2	3	4	Total
**Colts**	7	6	0	6	**19**
Chiefs	3	7	0	3	**13**

at Arrowhead Stadium, Kansas City, Missouri

- Date: October 6
- Game time: 8:20 p.m. EDT/7:20 p.m. CDT
- Game weather: Cloudy, 59 °F (15 °C)
- Game attendance: 73,352
- Referee: Craig Wrolstad
- TV announcers (NBC): Al Michaels, Cris Collinsworth and Michele Tafoya
- Recap, Game Book

Game information

**First quarter**

- KC – Harrison Butker 29-yard field goal, 9:02. Chiefs 3–0. **Drive: 12 plays, 64 yards, 5:58.**
- IND – Jacoby Brissett 1-yard run (Adam Vinatieri kick), 3:44. Colts 7–3. **Drive: 11 plays, 70 yards, 5:18.**

**Second quarter**

- KC – Byron Pringle 27-yard pass from Patrick Mahomes (Harrison Butker kick), 14:08. Chiefs 10–7. **Drive: 11 plays, 75 yards, 4:36.**
- IND – Adam Vinatieri 32-yard field goal, 11:12. Tied 10–10. **Drive: 7 plays, 61 yards, 2:56.**
- IND – Adam Vinatieri 31-yard field goal, 0:10. Colts 13–10. **Drive: 11 plays, 74 yards, 1:34.**

**Third quarter**

- No scoring plays.

**Fourth quarter**

- IND – Adam Vinatieri 31-yard field goal, 7:40. Colts 16–10. **Drive: 14 plays, 35 yards, 8:34.**
- IND – Adam Vinatieri 29-yard field goal, 2:27. Colts 19–10. **Drive: 7 plays, 21 yards, 2:35.**
- KC – Harrison Butker 36-yard field goal, 1:16. Colts 19–13. **Drive: 7 plays, 57 yards, 1:11.**

**Top passers**

- IND – Jacoby Brissett – 18/29, 151 yards, INT
- KC – Patrick Mahomes – 22/39, 321 yards, TD

**Top rushers**

- IND – Marlon Mack – 29 rushes, 132 yards
- KC – Damien Williams – 9 rushes, 23 yards

**Top receivers**

- IND – Nyheim Hines – 4 receptions, 46 yards
- KC – Byron Pringle – 6 receptions, 103 yards, TD

==== Week 7: vs. Houston Texans ====
Week Seven: Houston Texans at Indianapolis Colts – Game summary

Quarter	1	2	3	4	Total
Texans	0	9	7	7	**23**
**Colts**	7	7	14	2	**30**

at Lucas Oil Stadium, Indianapolis, Indiana

- Date: October 20
- Game time: 1:00 p.m. EDT
- Game weather: Sunny, 64 °F (18 °C) (roof open)
- Game attendance: 59,977
- Referee: Tony Corrente
- TV announcers (CBS): Greg Gumbel, Trent Green and Melanie Collins
- Recap, Game Book

Game information

**First quarter**

- IND – Zach Pascal 11-yard pass from Jacoby Brissett (Adam Vinatieri kick), 5:01. Colts 7–0. **Drive: 12 plays, 94 yards, 4:59.**

**Second quarter**

- HOU – Kaʻimi Fairbairn 47-yard field goal, 8:59. Colts 7–3. **Drive: 7 plays, 16 yards, 4:05.**
- HOU – Kaʻimi Fairbairn 31-yard field goal, 6:25. Colts 7–6. **Drive: 4 plays, −9 yards, 1:02.**
- IND – T. Y. Hilton 2-yard pass from Jacoby Brissett (Adam Vinatieri kick), 1:49. Colts 14–6. **Drive: 9 plays, 75 yards, 4:36.**
- HOU – Kaʻimi Fairbairn 26-yard field goal, 0:23. Colts 14–9. **Drive: 8 plays, 67 yards, 1:26.**

**Third quarter**

- IND – Eric Ebron 4-yard pass from Jacoby Brissett (Adam Vinatieri kick), 10:29. Colts 21–9. **Drive: 8 plays, 74 yards, 4:31.**
- HOU – Keke Coutee 4-yard run (Kaʻimi Fairbairn kick), 8:43. Colts 21–16. **Drive: 5 plays, 75 yards, 1:46.**
- IND – Zach Pascal 3-yard pass from Jacoby Brissett (Adam Vinatieri kick), 1:14. Colts 28–16. **Drive: 12 plays, 75 yards, 7:29.**

**Fourth quarter**

- HOU – DeAndre Hopkins 4-yard pass from Deshaun Watson (Kaʻimi Fairbairn kick), 6:38. Colts 28–23. **Drive: 6 plays, 79 yards, 2:03.**
- IND – Bryan Anger OB in end zone, forced by Zach Pascal, for a safety 2:41. Colts 30–23.

**Top passers**

- HOU – Deshaun Watson – 23/34, 308 yards, TD, 2 INT
- IND – Jacoby Brissett – 26/39, 326 yards, 4 TD

**Top rushers**

- HOU – Carlos Hyde – 12 rushes, 35 yards
- IND – Marlon Mack – 18 rushes, 44 yards

**Top receivers**

- HOU – DeAndre Hopkins – 9 receptions, 106 yards, TD
- IND – Zach Pascal – 6 receptions, 106 yards, 2 TD

==== Week 8: vs. Denver Broncos ====
Week Eight: Denver Broncos at Indianapolis Colts – Game summary

Quarter	1	2	3	4	Total
Broncos	0	6	7	0	**13**
**Colts**	0	3	9	3	**15**

at Lucas Oil Stadium, Indianapolis, Indiana

- Date: October 27
- Game time: 1:00 p.m. EDT
- Game weather: Mostly sunny, 55 °F (13 °C) (retractable roof open)
- Game attendance: 61,653
- Referee: Walt Anderson
- TV announcers (CBS): Ian Eagle, Dan Fouts and Evan Washburn
- Recap, Game Book

Game information

**First quarter**

- No scoring plays.

**Second quarter**

- DEN – Brandon McManus 21-yard field goal, 12:56. Broncos 3–0. **Drive: 17 plays, 86 yards, 7:45.**
- DEN – Brandon McManus 29-yard field goal, 5:33. Broncos 6–0. **Drive: 13 plays, 73 yards, 5:38.**
- IND – Adam Vinatieri 55-yard field goal, 0:02. Broncos 6–3. **Drive: 6 plays, 43 yards, 0:55.**

**Third quarter**

- DEN – Royce Freeman 4-yard run (Brandon McManus kick), 11:38. Broncos 13–3. **Drive: 5 plays, 75 yards, 3:22.**
- IND – Adam Vinatieri 45-yard field goal, 6:05. Broncos 13–6. **Drive: 12 plays, 48 yards, 5:33.**
- IND – Marlon Mack 10-yard run (kick failed), 2:26. Broncos 13–12. **Drive: 6 plays, 68 yards, 2:44.**

**Fourth quarter**

- IND – Adam Vinatieri 51-yard field goal, 0:02. Colts 15–13. **Drive: 7 plays, 56 yards, 1:26.**

**Top passers**

- DEN – Joe Flacco – 20/32, 174 yards
- IND – Jacoby Brissett – 15/25, 202 yards

**Top rushers**

- DEN – Phillip Lindsay – 14 rushes, 59 yards
- IND – Marlon Mack – 19 rushes, 76 yards, TD

**Top receivers**

- DEN – Courtland Sutton – 3 receptions, 72 yards
- IND – Jack Doyle – 4 receptions, 61 yards

==== Week 9: at Pittsburgh Steelers ====
Week Nine: Indianapolis Colts at Pittsburgh Steelers – Game summary

Quarter	1	2	3	4	Total
Colts	3	13	2	6	**24**
**Steelers**	3	10	7	6	**26**

at Heinz Field, Pittsburgh, Pennsylvania

- Date: November 3
- Game time: 1:00 p.m. EST
- Game weather: Partly cloudy, 48 °F (9 °C)
- Game attendance: 61,116
- Referee: Brad Allen
- TV announcers (CBS): Ian Eagle, Dan Fouts and Evan Washburn
- Recap, Game Book

Game information

**First quarter**

- IND – Adam Vinatieri 25-yard field goal, 7:09. Colts 3–0. **Drive: 8 plays, 28 yards, 5:11.**
- PIT – Chris Boswell 21-yard field goal, 0:58. Tied 3–3. **Drive: 11 plays, 72 yards, 6:11.**

**Second quarter**

- IND – Jack Doyle 11-yard pass from Brian Hoyer (Adam Vinatieri kick), 11:57. Colts 10–3. **Drive: 8 plays, 63 yards, 4:01.**
- PIT – Minkah Fitzpatrick 96-yard interception return (Chris Boswell kick), 2:21. Tied 10–10.
- IND – Zach Pascal 14-yard pass from Brian Hoyer (kick blocked), 0:42. Colts 16–10. **Drive: 6 plays, 75 yards, 1:39.**
- PIT – Chris Boswell 51-yard field goal, 0:00. Colts 16–13. **Drive: 6 plays, 47 yards, 0:42.**

**Third quarter**

- PIT – Vance McDonald 7-yard pass from Mason Rudolph (Chris Boswell kick), 5:25. Steelers 20–16. **Drive: 11 plays, 54 yards, 5:15.**
- IND – Alejandro Villanueva tackled in end zone by Justin Houston, 1:05. Steelers 20–18.

**Fourth quarter**

- PIT – Chris Boswell 33-yard field goal, 14:57. Steelers 23–18. **Drive: 4 plays, 2 yards, 1:01.**
- IND – Chester Rogers 4-yard pass from Brian Hoyer (pass failed), 8:43. Colts 24–23. **Drive: 7 plays, 30 yards, 3:12.**
- PIT – Chris Boswell 26-yard field goal, 6:36. Steelers 26–24. **Drive: 6 plays, 67 yards, 2:07.**

**Top passers**

- IND – Brian Hoyer – 17/26, 168 yards, 3 TD, INT
- PIT – Mason Rudolph – 26/35, 191 yards, TD, INT

**Top rushers**

- IND – Marlon Mack – 21 rushes, 89 yards
- PIT – Trey Edmunds – 12 rushes, 73 yards

**Top receivers**

- IND – Zach Pascal – 5 receptions, 76 yards, TD
- PIT – Jaylen Samuels – 13 receptions, 73 yards

Adam Vinatieri missed a potential game-winning field goal late in the fourth quarter, resulting in a narrow two-point loss.

==== Week 10: vs. Miami Dolphins ====
Week Ten: Miami Dolphins at Indianapolis Colts – Game summary

Quarter	1	2	3	4	Total
**Dolphins**	3	7	0	6	**16**
Colts	0	0	6	6	**12**

at Lucas Oil Stadium, Indianapolis, Indiana

- Date: November 10
- Game time: 4:05 p.m. EST
- Game weather: None (retractable roof closed)
- Game attendance: 60,510
- Referee: Clay Martin
- TV announcers (CBS): Greg Gumbel, Trent Green and Melanie Collins
- Recap, Game Book

Game information

**First quarter**

- MIA – Jason Sanders 47-yard field goal, 6:44. Dolphins 3–0. **Drive: 8 plays, 51 yards, 3:45.**

**Second quarter**

- MIA – Ryan Fitzpatrick 11-yard run (Jason Sanders kick), 1:52. Dolphins 10–0. **Drive: 3 plays, 12 yards, 1:34.**

**Third quarter**

- IND – Adam Vinatieri 25-yard field goal, 7:50. Dolphins 10–3. **Drive: 10 plays, 56 yard, 4:24.**
- IND – Adam Vinatieri 39-yard field goal, 0:38. Dolphins 10–6. **Drive: 10 plays, 28 yards, 5:03.**

**Fourth quarter**

- IND – Jack Doyle 1-yard pass from Brian Hoyer (kick failed, wide left), 11:30. Colts 12–10. **Drive: 7 plays, 34 yards, 3:24.**
- MIA – Jason Sanders 48-yard field goal, 5:45. Dolphins 13–10. **Drive: 12 plays, 45 yards, 5:45.**
- MIA – Jason Sanders 48-yard field goal, 3:31. Dolphins 16–10. **Drive: 4 plays, 5 yards, 2:06.**

**Top passers**

- MIA – Ryan Fitzpatrick – 21/33, 169 yards, INT
- IND – Brian Hoyer – 18/39, 204 yards, TD, 3 INT

**Top rushers**

- MIA – Kalen Ballage – 20 carries, 43 yards
- IND – Marlon Mack – 19 carries, 74 yards

**Top receivers**

- MIA – DeVante Parker – 5 receptions, 69 yards
- IND – Eric Ebron – 5 receptions, 56 yards

==== Week 11: vs. Jacksonville Jaguars ====
Week Eleven: Jacksonville Jaguars at Indianapolis Colts – Game summary

Quarter	1	2	3	4	Total
Jaguars	7	0	0	6	**13**
**Colts**	7	3	14	9	**33**

at Lucas Oil Stadium, Indianapolis, Indiana

- Date: November 17
- Game time: 1:00 p.m. EST
- Game weather: None (retractable roof closed)
- Game attendance: 61,986
- Referee: Shawn Hochuli
- TV announcers (CBS): Andrew Catalon, James Lofton and Michael Grady
- Recap, Game Book

Game information

**First quarter**

- JAX – D. J. Chark 34-yard pass from Nick Foles (Josh Lambo kick), 6:53. Jaguars 7–0. **Drive: 5 plays, 60 yards, 3:02.**
- IND – Marlon Mack 13-yard run (Adam Vinatieri kick), 0:35. Tied 7–7. **Drive: 11 plays, 76 yards, 6:18.**

**Second quarter**

- IND – Adam Vinatieri 34-yard field goal, 8:26. Colts 10–7. **Drive: 9 plays, 54 yards, 4:11.**

**Third quarter**

- IND – Marcus Johnson 1-yard pass from Jacoby Brissett (Adam Vinatieri kick), 8:46. Colts 17–7. **Drive: 10 plays, 77 yards, 6:14.**
- IND – Jacoby Brissett 5-yard run (Adam Vinatieri kick), 0:58. Colts 24–7. **Drive: 5 plays, 56 yards, 2:55.**

**Fourth quarter**

- IND – Nyheim Hines 7-yard run (Adam Vinatieri kick), 12:42. Colts 31–7. **Drive: 4 plays, 64 yards, 2:10.**
- JAX – D. J. Chark 20-yard pass from Nick Foles, 0:59. Colts 31–13. **Drive: 11 plays, 90 yards, 3:29.**
- IND - Nick Foles pass to Chris Conley intercepted, returned by Bobby Okereke for 2 point conversion, 0:59. Colts 33–13.

**Top passers**

- JAX – Nick Foles – 33/47, 296 yards, 2 TD, INT
- IND – Jacoby Brissett – 15/24, 148 yards, TD, INT

**Top rushers**

- JAX – Leonard Fournette – 8 rushes, 23 yards
- IND – Jonathan Williams – 4 rushes, 33 yards, TD

**Top receivers**

- JAX – D. J. Chark – 8 receptions, 105 yards, 2 TD
- IND – Marcus Johnson – 4 receptions, 38 yards

The Colts would defeat the Jacksonville Jaguars for the team's 300th win in the Indianapolis era with a record of 300–267.

==== Week 12: at Houston Texans ====
Week Twelve: Indianapolis Colts at Houston Texans – Game summary

Quarter	1	2	3	4	Total
Colts	0	10	7	0	**17**
**Texans**	0	10	3	7	**20**

at NRG Stadium, Houston, Texas

- Date: November 21
- Game time: 8:20 p.m. EST/7:20 p.m. CST
- Game weather: None (retractable roof closed)
- Game attendance: 71,727
- Referee: Ronald Torbert
- TV announcers (Fox/NFLN/Amazon Prime): Joe Buck, Troy Aikman, Erin Andrews and Kristina Pink
- Recap, Game Book

Game information

**First quarter**

- No scoring plays.

**Second quarter**

- HOU – Kaʻimi Fairbairn 35-yard field goal, 13:42. Texans 3–0. **Drive: 10 plays, 37 yards, 4:30.**
- IND – Jacoby Brissett 5-yard run (Adam Vinatieri kick), 4:28. Colts 7–3. **Drive: 7 plays, 42 yards, 3:27.**
- HOU – DeAndre Hopkins 35-yard pass from Deshaun Watson (Kaʻimi Fairbairn kick), 1:53. Texans 10–7. **Drive: 7 plays, 75 yards, 2:35.**
- IND – Adam Vinatieri 36-yard field goal, 0:00. Tied 10–10. **Drive: 10 plays, 58 yards, 1:53.**

**Third quarter**

- IND – Jonathan Williams 13-yard run (Adam Vinatieri kick), 5:36. Colts 17–10. **Drive: 11 plays, 66 yards, 6:09.**
- HOU – Kaʻimi Fairbairn 36-yard field goal, 2:43. Colts 17–13. **Drive: 5 plays, 57 yards, 2:53.**

**Fourth quarter**

- HOU – DeAndre Hopkins 30-yard pass from Deshaun Watson (Kaʻimi Fairbairn kick), 12:34. Texans 20–17. **Drive: 8 plays, 86 yards, 3:37.**

**Top passers**

- IND – Jacoby Brissett – 16/25, 129 yards
- HOU – Deshaun Watson – 19/30, 298 yards, 2 TD, INT

**Top rushers**

- IND – Jonathan Williams – 26 rushes, 104 yards, TD
- HOU – Carlos Hyde – 16 rushes, 67 yards

**Top receivers**

- IND – Eric Ebron – 4 receptions, 44 yards
- HOU – Will Fuller – 7 receptions, 140 yards

==== Week 13: vs. Tennessee Titans ====
Week Thirteen: Tennessee Titans at Indianapolis Colts – Game summary

Quarter	1	2	3	4	Total
**Titans**	7	0	10	14	**31**
Colts	7	3	7	0	**17**

at Lucas Oil Stadium, Indianapolis, Indiana

- Date: December 1
- Game time: 1:00 p.m. EST
- Game weather: None (retractable roof closed)
- Game attendance: 60,361
- Referee: Carl Cheffers
- TV announcers (CBS): Kevin Harlan, Rich Gannon and Jay Feely
- Recap, Game Book

Game information

**First quarter**

- IND – Jack Doyle 21-yard pass from Jacoby Brissett (Adam Vinatieri kick), 11:03. Colts 7–0. **Drive: 6 plays, 39 yards, 3:48.**
- TEN – Adam Humphries 13-yard pass from Ryan Tannehill (Ryan Succop kick), 5:05. Tied 7–7. **Drive: 11 plays, 75 yards, 5:58.**

**Second quarter**

- IND – Adam Vinatieri 28-yard field goal, 6:07. Colts 10–7. **Drive: 11 plays, 80 yards, 6:20.**

**Third quarter**

- IND – Nyheim Hines 1-yard run (Adam Vinatieri kick), 10:23. Colts 17–7. **Drive: 11 plays, 75 yards, 4:37.**
- TEN – Derrick Henry 13-yard run (Ryan Succop kick), 5:52. Colts 17–14. **Drive: 8 plays, 75 yards, 4:31.**
- TEN – Ryan Succop 31-yard field goal, 4:26. Tied 17–17. **Drive: 4 plays, 2 yards, 1:14.**

**Fourth quarter**

- TEN – Tye Smith 63-yard blocked field goal return (Ryan Succop kick), 5:02. Titans 24–17.
- TEN – Kalif Raymond 40-yard pass from Ryan Tannehill (Ryan Succop kick), 3:02. Titans 31–17. **Drive: 3 plays, 44 yards, 1:39.**

**Top passers**

- TEN – Ryan Tannehill – 17/22, 182 yards, 2 TD
- IND – Jacoby Brissett – 25/40, 319 yards, TD, 2 INT

**Top rushers**

- TEN – Derrick Henry – 26 rushes, 149 yards, TD
- IND – Jordan Wilkins – 11 rushes, 47 yards

**Top receivers**

- TEN – A. J. Brown – 3 receptions, 45 yards
- IND – Zach Pascal – 7 receptions, 109 yards

==== Week 14: at Tampa Bay Buccaneers ====
Week Fourteen: Indianapolis Colts at Tampa Bay Buccaneers – Game summary

Quarter	1	2	3	4	Total
Colts	10	17	8	0	**35**
**Buccaneers**	14	7	7	10	**38**

at Raymond James Stadium, Tampa, Florida

- Date: December 8
- Game time: 1:00 p.m. EST
- Game weather: Cloudy, 78 °F (26 °C)
- Game attendance: 50,232
- Referee: Tony Corrente
- TV announcers (CBS): Spero Dedes and Adam Archuleta
- Recap, Game Book

Game information

**First quarter**

- IND – Marcus Johnson 46-yard pass from Jacoby Brissett (Chase McLaughlin kick), 12:45. Colts 7–0. **Drive: 3 plays, 50 yards, 1:33.**
- IND – Chase McLaughlin 50-yard field goal, 6:53. Colts 10–0. **Drive: 7 plays, 16 yards, 2:41.**
- TB – Jameis Winston 1-yard run (Matt Gay kick), 1:41. Colts 10–7. **Drive: 10 plays, 75 yards, 5:12.**
- TB – Mike Evans 61-yard pass from Jameis Winston (Matt Gay kick), 1:06. Buccaneers 14–10. **Drive: 1 play, 61 yards, 0:09.**

**Second quarter**

- IND – Marlon Mack 2-yard run (Chase McLaughlin kick), 7:42. Colts 17–14. **Drive: 10 plays, 47 yards, 4:52.**
- IND – Shaquille Leonard 80-yard interception return (Chase McLaughlin kick), 2:32. Colts 24–14.
- TB – Cameron Brate 3-yard pass from Jameis Winston (Matt Gay kick), 0:38. Colts 24–21. **Drive: 11 plays, 75 yards, 1:54.**
- IND – Chase McLaughlin 19-yard field goal, 0:00. Colts 27–21. **Drive: 6 plays, 74 yards, 0:38.**

**Third quarter**

- IND – Zach Pascal 12-yard pass from Jacoby Brissett (Jacoby Brissett–Zach Pascal pass), 5:59. Colts 35–21. **Drive: 7 plays, 76 yards, 3:34.**
- TB – Justin Watson 17-yard pass from Jameis Winston (Matt Gay kick), 3:18. Colts 35–28. **Drive: 5 plays, 75 yards, 2:41.**

**Fourth quarter**

- TB – Matt Gay 44-yard field goal, 13:00. Colts 35–31. **Drive: 10 plays, 55 yards, 3:43.**
- TB – Breshad Perriman 12-yard pass from Jameis Winston (Matt Gay kick), 3:51. Buccaneers 38–35. **Drive: 8 plays, 63 yards, 4:22.**

**Top passers**

- IND – Jacoby Brissett – 19/36, 251 yards, 2 TD
- TB – Jameis Winston – 33/45, 456 yards, 4 TD, 3 INT

**Top rushers**

- IND – Marlon Mack – 13 rushes, 38 yards, TD
- TB – Ronald Jones – 11 rushes, 36 yards

**Top receivers**

- IND – Marcus Johnson – 3 receptions, 105 yards, TD
- TB – Chris Godwin – 7 receptions, 91 yards

==== Week 15: at New Orleans Saints ====
Week Fifteen: Indianapolis Colts at New Orleans Saints – Game summary

Quarter	1	2	3	4	Total
Colts	0	0	0	7	**7**
**Saints**	3	17	14	0	**34**

at Mercedes-Benz Superdome, New Orleans, Louisiana

- Date: December 16
- Game time: 8:15 p.m. EST/7:15 p.m. CST
- Game weather: None (indoor stadium)
- Game attendance: 73,053
- Referee: Shawn Hochuli
- TV announcers (ESPN): Joe Tessitore, Booger McFarland and Lisa Salters
- Recap, Game Book

Game information

**First quarter**

- NO - Wil Lutz 33-yard field goal, 7:28. Saints 3-0. **Drive: 6 plays, 18 yards, 3:35.**

**Second quarter**

- NO - Michael Thomas 15-yard pass from Drew Brees (Wil Lutz kick), 12:37. Saints 10-0. **Drive: 12 plays, 90 yards, 6:17.**
- NO - Tre'Quan Smith 21-yard pass from Drew Brees (Wil Lutz kick), 6:11. Saints 17-0. **Drive: 10 plays, 85 yards, 6:09.**
- NO - Wil Lutz 26-yard field goal, 0:00. Saints 20-0. **Drive: 10 plays, 80 yards, 3:02.**

**Third quarter**

- NO - Josh Hill 5-yard pass from Drew Brees (Wil Lutz kick), 7:08. Saints 27-0. **Drive: 12 plays, 75 yards, 7:52.**
- NO - Taysom Hill 28-yard pass from Drew Brees (Wil Lutz kick), 0:35. Saints 34-0. **Drive: 3 plays, 51 yards, 1:23.**

**Fourth quarter**

- IND - Jordan Wilkins 1-yard run (Chase McLaughlin kick), 3:56. Saints 34-7. **Drive: 11 plays, 80 yards, 3:21.**

**Top passers**

- IND - Jacoby Brissett - 18/34, 165 yards
- NO - Drew Brees - 29/30, 307 yards, 4 TD

**Top rushers**

- IND - Marlon Mack - 11 rushes, 19 yards
- NO - Alvin Kamara - 14 rushes, 66 yards

**Top receivers**

- IND - Zach Pascal - 4 receptions, 44 yards
- NO - Michael Thomas - 12 receptions, 128 yards

The loss eliminated the Colts from postseason contention.

==== Week 16: vs. Carolina Panthers ====
Week Sixteen: Carolina Panthers at Indianapolis Colts – Game summary

Quarter	1	2	3	4	Total
Panthers	0	3	3	0	**6**
**Colts**	14	7	3	14	**38**

at Lucas Oil Stadium, Indianapolis, Indiana

- Date: December 22
- Game time: 1:00 p.m. EST
- Game weather: None (retractable roof closed)
- Game attendance: 61,845
- Referee: Walt Anderson
- TV announcers (Fox): Dick Stockton, Mark Schlereth and Jennifer Hale
- Recap, Game Book

Game information

**First quarter**

- IND – Jacoby Brissett 1-yard run (Chase McLaughlin kick), 9:28. Colts 7–0. **Drive: 8 plays, 36 yards, 4:19.**
- IND – Nyheim Hines 84-yard punt return (Chase McLaughlin kick), 7:41. Colts 14–0.

**Second quarter**

- CAR – Joey Slye 27-yard field goal, 10:18. Colts 14–3. **Drive: 12 plays, 61 yards, 5:12.**
- IND – Marlon Mack 2-yard run (Chase McLaughlin kick), 5:14. Colts 21–3. **Drive: 9 plays, 75 yards, 5:04.**

**Third quarter**

- IND – Chase McLaughlin 35-yard field goal, 10:59. Colts 24–3. **Drive: 10 plays, 58 yards, 4:01.**
- CAR – Joey Slye 50-yard field goal, 4:16. Colts 24–6. **Drive: 12 plays, 43 yards, 6:43.**

**Fourth quarter**

- IND – Nyheim Hines 71-yard punt return (Chase McLaughlin kick), 7:16. Colts 31–6.
- IND – Jordan Wilkins 1-yard run (Chase McLaughlin kick), 3:10. Colts 38–6. **Drive: 8 plays, 76 yards, 3:34.**

**Top passers**

- CAR – Will Grier – 27/44, 224 yards, 3 INT
- IND – Jacoby Brissett – 14/27, 119 yards

**Top rushers**

- CAR – Christian McCaffrey – 13 rushes, 54 yards
- IND – Marlon Mack – 16 rushes, 95 yards, TD

**Top receivers**

- CAR – Christian McCaffrey – 15 receptions, 119 yards
- IND – T. Y. Hilton – 3 receptions, 26 yards

==== Week 17: at Jacksonville Jaguars ====
Week Seventeen: Indianapolis Colts at Jacksonville Jaguars – Game summary

Quarter	1	2	3	4	Total
Colts	10	10	0	0	**20**
**Jaguars**	3	13	8	14	**38**

at TIAA Bank Field, Jacksonville, Florida

- Date: December 29
- Game time: 4:25 p.m. EST
- Game attendance: 58,472
- Referee: Brad Allen
- TV announcers (CBS): Spero Dedes and Adam Archuleta
- Recap, Game Book

Game information

**First quarter**

- IND – Chase McLaughlin 20-yard field goal, 9:06. Colts 3–0. **Drive: 11 plays, 73 yards, 5:54.**
- JAX – Josh Lambo 20-yard field goal, 6:19. Tied 3–3. **Drive: 7 plays, 42 yards, 2:47.**
- IND – Marlon Mack 5-yard run (Chase McLaughlin kick), 0:41. Colts 10–3. **Drive: 12 plays, 79 yards, 5:38.**

**Second quarter**

- JAX – Josh Lambo 53-yard field goal, 12:00. Colts 10–6. **Drive: 9 plays, 40 yards, 3:41.**
- JAX – Keelan Cole 14-yard pass from Gardner Minshew (Josh Lambo kick), 5:42. Jaguars 13–10. **Drive: 7 plays, 90 yards, 3:59.**
- IND – Marlon Mack 8-yard run (Chase McLaughlin kick), 2:11. Colts 17–13. **Drive: 6 plays, 55 yards, 3:31.**
- IND – Chase McLaughlin 50-yard field goal, 0:39. Colts 20–13. **Drive: 4 plays, 5 yards, 0:47.**
- JAX – Josh Lambo 56-yard field goal, 0:00. Colts 20–16. **Drive: 7 plays, 35 yards, 0:39.**

**Third quarter**

- JAX – Ryquell Armstead 3-yard pass from Gardner Minshew (Gardner Minshew–Dede Westbrook pass), 8:27. Jaguars 24–20. **Drive: 11 plays, 80 yards, 6:33.**

**Fourth quarter**

- JAX – Calais Campbell 8-yard fumble return (Josh Lambo kick), 9:28. Jaguars 31–20.
- JAX – Dede Westbrook 18-yard pass from Gardner Minshew (Josh Lambo kick), 4:42. Jaguars 38–20. **Drive: 6 plays, 34 yards, 3:03.**

**Top passers**

- IND – Jacoby Brissett – 12/25, 162 yards
- JAX – Gardner Minshew – 27/39, 295 yards, 3 TD, INT

**Top rushers**

- IND – Marlon Mack – 15 rushes, 77 yards, 2 TD
- JAX – Ryquell Armstead – 10 rushes, 33 yards

**Top receivers**

- IND – T. Y. Hilton – 3 receptions, 72 yards
- JAX – Dede Westbrook – 7 receptions, 72 yards, TD

=== Standings ===
==== Division ====
AFC South
	W	L	T	PCT	DIV	CONF	PF	PA	STK
^{(4)} Houston Texans	10	6	0	.625	4–2	8–4	378	385	L1
^{(6)} Tennessee Titans	9	7	0	.563	3–3	7–5	402	331	W1
Indianapolis Colts	7	9	0	.438	3–3	5–7	361	373	L1
Jacksonville Jaguars	6	10	0	.375	2–4	6–6	300	397	W1

==== Conference ====
AFC
#	Team	Division	W	L	T	PCT	DIV	CONF	SOS	SOV	STK
**Division leaders**
1	Baltimore Ravens	North	14	2	0	.875	5–1	10–2	.494	.484	W12
2 (Note: Kansas City claimed the No. 2 seed over New England based on head-to-head victory.)	Kansas City Chiefs	West	12	4	0	.750	6–0	9–3	.510	.477	W6
3	New England Patriots	East	12	4	0	.750	5–1	8–4	.469	.411	L1
4	Houston Texans	South	10	6	0	.625	4–2	8–4	.520	.488	L1
**Wild Cards**
5	Buffalo Bills	East	10	6	0	.625	3–3	7–5	.461	.363	L2
6	Tennessee Titans	South	9	7	0	.563	3–3	7–5	.488	.465	W1
**Did not qualify for the postseason**
7	Pittsburgh Steelers	North	8	8	0	.500	3–3	6–6	.502	.324	L3
8 (Note: Denver finished ahead of Indianapolis and NY Jets based on conference record. Division tiebreak was initially used to eliminate Oakland (see below).) (Note: Denver finished ahead of Oakland based on conference record.)	Denver Broncos	West	7	9	0	.438	3–3	6–6	.510	.406	W2
9 (Note: Oakland and Indianapolis finished ahead of NY Jets based on conference record.) (Note: Oakland finished ahead of Indianapolis based on head-to-head victory.)	Oakland Raiders	West	7	9	0	.438	3–3	5–7	.482	.335	L1
10	Indianapolis Colts	South	7	9	0	.438	3–3	5–7	.492	.500	L1
11	New York Jets	East	7	9	0	.438	2–4	4–8	.473	.402	W2
12 (Note: Jacksonville finished ahead of Cleveland based on record against common opponents. Jacksonville's cumulative record against Cincinnati, Denver, NY Jets, and Tennessee was 4–1, compared to Cleveland's 2–3 cumulative record against the same four teams.)	Jacksonville Jaguars	South	6	10	0	.375	2–4	6–6	.484	.406	W1
13	Cleveland Browns	North	6	10	0	.375	3–3	6–6	.533	.479	L3
14 (Note: LA Chargers finished ahead of Miami based on head-to-head victory.)	Los Angeles Chargers	West	5	11	0	.313	0–6	3–9	.514	.488	L3
15	Miami Dolphins	East	5	11	0	.313	2–4	4–8	.484	.463	W2
16	Cincinnati Bengals	North	2	14	0	.125	1–5	2–10	.553	.406	W1
**Tiebreakers** (Note: When breaking ties for three or more teams under the NFL's rules, they are first broken within divisions, then comparing only the highest ranked remaining team from each division.)
