= Zach Pascal =

American football player (born 1994)

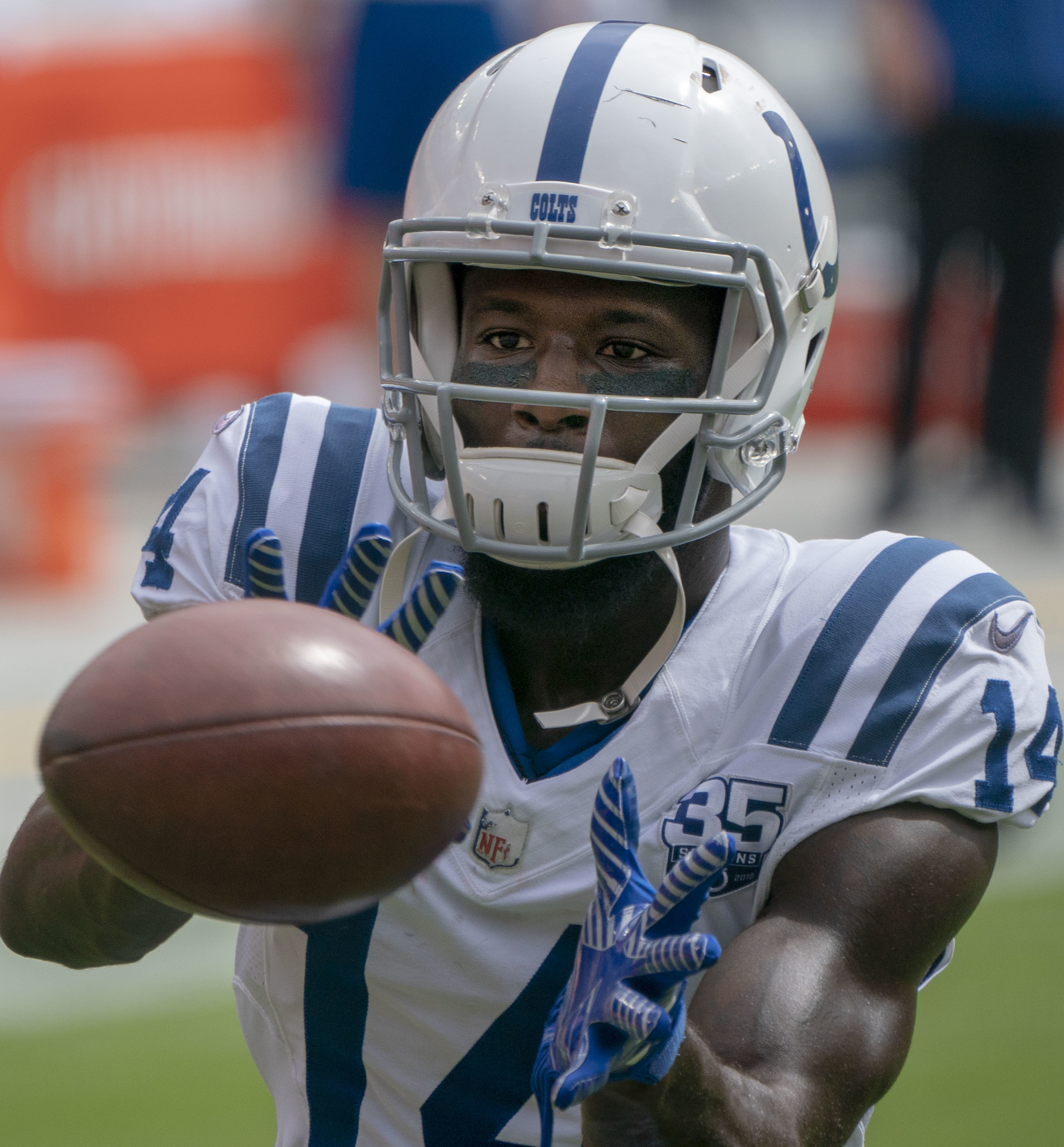
- Pascal with the Indianapolis Colts in 2018

No. 83
- Position: Wide receiver

Personal information
- Born: December 18, 1994 (age 31); Upper Marlboro, Maryland, U.S.
- Listed height: 6 ft 2 in (1.88 m)
- Listed weight: 219 lb (99 kg)

Career information
- High school: Dr. Henry A. Wise, Jr. (Upper Marlboro)
- College: Old Dominion (2012–2016)
- NFL draft: 2017: undrafted

Career history
- Washington Redskins (2017)*; Tennessee Titans (2017); Indianapolis Colts (2018–2021); Philadelphia Eagles (2022); Arizona Cardinals (2023–2024); New York Giants (2025)*
- * Offseason or practice squad member only

Career NFL statistics
- Receptions: 169
- Receiving yards: 2,057
- Receiving touchdowns: 16
- Stats at Pro Football Reference

Zach Pascal (born December 18, 1994) is an American professional football wide receiver. He played college football for the Old Dominion Monarchs.

== Early life ==
Pascal was born in Upper Marlboro, Maryland, U.S. to Grenadian parents. He attended and played high school football at Dr. Henry A. Wise Jr. High School. During his senior season, Pascal was named first-team all county and third-team all state.

== College career ==
Pascal attended and played college football at Old Dominion from 2014 to 2016. In 2016, he helped lead Old Dominion to the Bahamas Bowl, their first bowl game in program history. During the game, he gained 78 yards and scored a touchdown in the victory against Eastern Michigan.

== Professional career ==
Pre-draft measurables
Height	Weight	Arm length	Hand span	40-yard dash	10-yard split	20-yard split	20-yard shuttle	Three-cone drill	Vertical jump	Broad jump	Bench press
6 ft 1 5/8 in (1.87 m)	219 lb (99 kg)	32 in (0.81 m)	10 in (0.25 m)	4.55 s	1.54 s	2.61 s	4.29 s	7.11 s	36.0 in (0.91 m)	10 ft 6 in (3.20 m)	14 reps
All values from NFL Combine

=== Washington Redskins ===
Pascal signed with the Washington Redskins as an undrafted free agent following the 2017 NFL draft. He was waived by the Redskins on September 2, 2017.

=== Tennessee Titans ===
On September 4, 2017, Pascal was signed to the practice squad of the Tennessee Titans. He was promoted to the active roster on September 20. He was waived on September 23, and was re-signed to the practice squad. He signed a reserve/future contract with the Titans on January 15, 2018. He was waived on June 14.

=== Indianapolis Colts ===
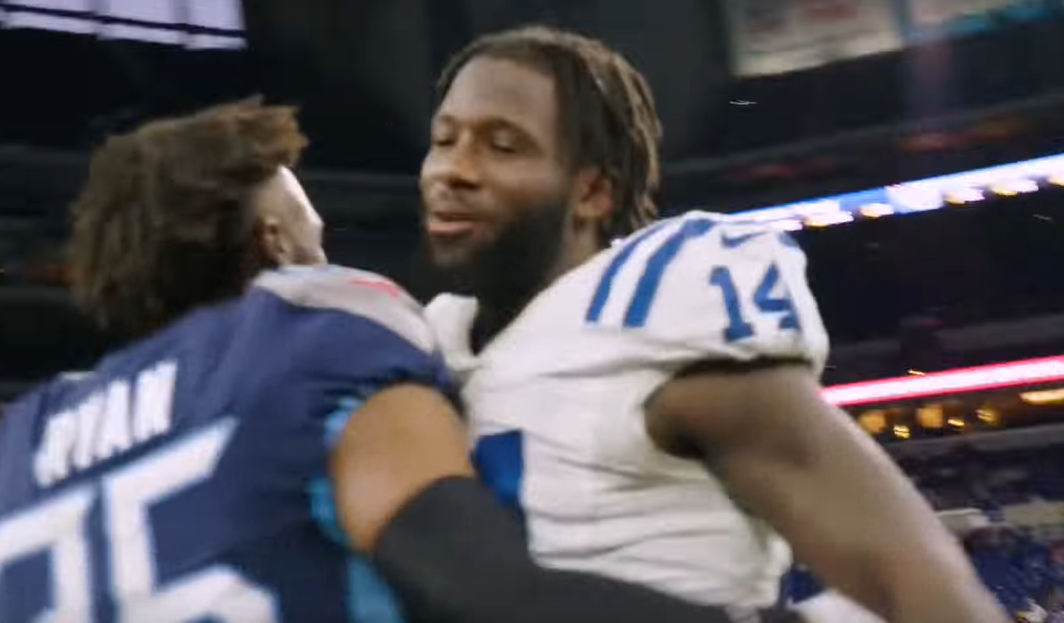
Pascal embracing Logan Ryan of the Titans

On June 15, 2018, Pascal was claimed off of waivers by the Indianapolis Colts. He competed for a spot and made the 53-man roster. In the Colts' season opener against the Cincinnati Bengals, Pascal had one reception for 18 yards to go along with two kick returns for 54 net yards. On September 30, he scored his first NFL touchdown with a pass from Andrew Luck in an overtime loss to the Houston Texans. In the 2018 season, he had 27 receptions for 268 yards and two touchdowns. In the Divisional Round loss to the Kansas City Chiefs, Pascal scored a touchdown when he recovered a blocked punt in the endzone.

On October 20, 2019, in Week 7 against the Texans, Pascal finished with 106 receiving yards and two touchdowns, marking the first time in his professional career with over 100 yards. In Week 13 against the Titans, Pascal caught seven passes for 109 yards in the 31–17 loss. On December 30, 2019, Pascal was signed to a one-year extension through 2020. Overall, Pascal finished the 2019 season with 41 receptions for 607 receiving yards and five receiving touchdowns.

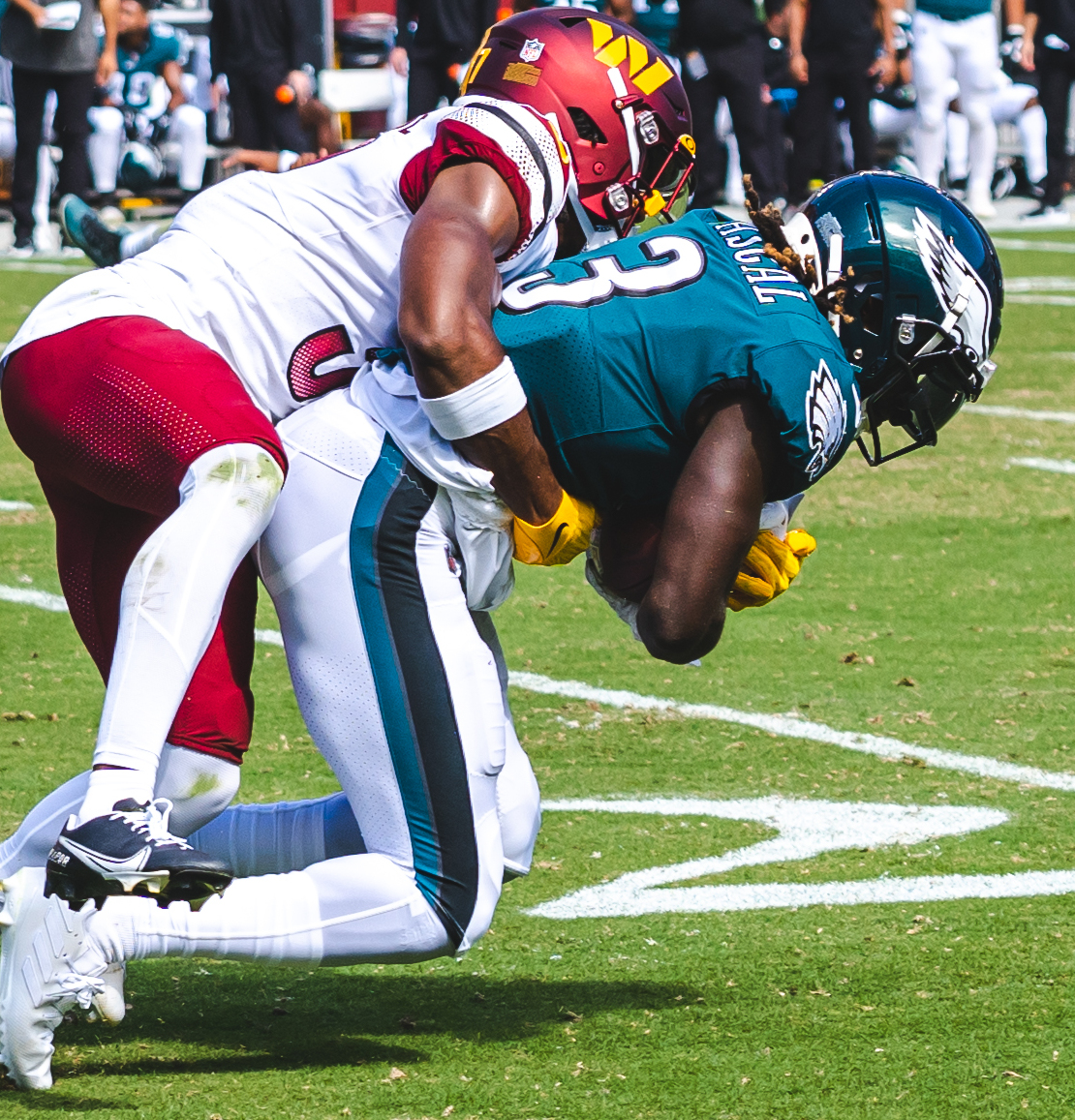
Pascal makes a catch in 2022

In Week 15 of the 2020 season against the Texans, Pascal recorded five catches for 79 yards and two touchdowns during the 27–20 win. Pascal finished the 2020 regular season with 44 receptions for 629 receiving yards and five receiving touchdowns. Pascal scored a receiving touchdown in the Colts 27–24 loss to the Buffalo Bills in the Wild Card Round.

The Colts placed a second-round restricted free agent tender on Pascal on March 17, 2021. He signed the one-year contract on April 19. Pascal started the 2021 season with two receiving touchdowns in Week 1 against the Seattle Seahawks. In the 2021 season, Pascal finished with 38 receptions for 384 receiving yards and three receiving touchdowns.

=== Philadelphia Eagles ===
On March 21, 2022, Pascal signed a one-year contract with the Philadelphia Eagles, reuniting him with his former Colts offensive coordinator Nick Sirianni, who is the Eagles head coach. He originally chose to wear No. 11, but switched to number 3 when the Eagles acquired A. J. Brown. In the 2022 season, Pascal appeared in 17 games and started two. He finished with 15 receptions for 150 receiving yards and one receiving touchdown, which came in Week 8 against the Pittsburgh Steelers. Pascal reached Super Bowl LVII, but the Eagles lost 38–35 to the Chiefs. In the Super Bowl, Pascal had two catches for 11 yards.

=== Arizona Cardinals ===
On March 20, 2023, Pascal signed a two-year, $4.5 million contract with the Arizona Cardinals. He appeared in 14 games and started one in the 2023 season. In the 2024 season, he mainly had a special teams role.

=== New York Giants ===
On March 22, 2025, Pascal signed a one-year contract with the New York Giants. He was waived by New York on August 22.

== Career statistics ==
=== NFL ===
Year	Team	Games		Receiving					Rushing					Fumbles	
Year	Team	GP	GS	Rec	Yds	Avg	Lng	TD	Att	Yds	Avg	Lng	TD	Fum	Lost
2018	IND	16	4	27	268	9.9	28	2	2	10	5.0	8	0	0	0
2019	IND	16	13	41	607	14.8	37	5	2	16	8.0	12	0	0	0
2020	IND	16	14	44	629	14.3	42	5	0	0	0.0	0	0	0	0
2021	IND	16	13	38	384	10.1	41	3	2	21	10.5	12	0	1	0
2022	PHI	17	2	15	150	10.0	34	1	1	0	0.0	0	0	0	0
2023	AZ	14	1	4	19	4.8	9	0	0	0	0.0	0	0	0	0
2024	AZ	17	0	0	0	0	0	0	0	0	0.0	0	0	0	0
Career		112	47	169	2,057	12.2	42	16	7	47	7.8	12	0	1	1

=== College ===
Season	Team	Conf	Class	Pos	GP	Receiving				Rushing			
Season	Team	Conf	Class	Pos	GP	Rec	Yds	Avg	TD	Att	Yds	Avg	TD
2014	Old Dominion	CUSA	SO	WR	12	59	743	12.6	7	0	0	0.0	0
2015	Old Dominion	CUSA	JR	WR	12	69	975	14.1	8	15	165	11.0	1
2016	Old Dominion	CUSA	SR	WR	13	65	946	14.6	9	23	145	6.3	0
Career					37	193	2,664	13.8	24	38	310	8.2	1
