= Kahzin Daniels =

American football player (born 1995)

No. 41
- Position: Linebacker

Personal information
- Born: October 26, 1995 (age 31); Newark, New Jersey, U.S.
- Listed height: 6 ft 4 in (1.93 m)
- Listed weight: 240 lb (109 kg)

Career information
- High school: Barringer (Newark, New Jersey)
- College: Charleston
- NFL draft: 2019: undrafted

Career history
- Tampa Bay Buccaneers (2019); Memphis Showboats (2023)

Awards and highlights
- First-team All-MEC (2018); Second-team All-MEC (2017)
- Stats at Pro Football Reference

Kahzin Daniels (born October 26, 1995) is an American former professional football linebacker. He played college football at the University of Charleston.

== College career ==
Daniels played four seasons for the Charleston Golden Eagles. He was named second-team All-Mountain East Conference (MEC) after recording 49 tackles and 12 sacks in his junior season. Daniels recorded 55 tackles, 18.5 tackles for loss and 9.5 sacks and was named first-team All-MEC as a senior. He finished his collegiate career with 161 total tackles and a school record 34.5 sacks.

== Professional career ==
=== Tampa Bay Buccaneers ===
Daniels signed with the Tampa Bay Buccaneers as an undrafted free agent on April 27, 2019. He was waived by the team with an injury designation on August 24, 2019, during training camp. Daniels was re-signed by the Buccaneers to their practice squad on October 17, 2019. The Bucs promoted him to the active roster on November 6. Daniels made his NFL debut on November 10, 2019, against the Arizona Cardinals. Daniels played in two games as rookie.

On September 5, 2020, Daniels was waived by the Buccaneers.

=== Memphis Showboats ===
Daniels signed with the Tampa Bay Bandits of the United States Football League on October 6, 2022.

Daniels and all other Tampa Bay Bandits players were all transferred to the Memphis Showboats after it was announced that the Bandits were taking a hiatus and that the Showboats were joining the league. He was placed on the team's injured reserve list on April 8, 2023. He was not part of the roster after the 2024 UFL dispersal draft on January 15, 2024. He was re-signed on February 15, 2024. He was released on March 10, 2024.

== Personal life ==
Daniels is legally blind in his right eye.
