= Deonte Thompson =

American football player (born 1989)

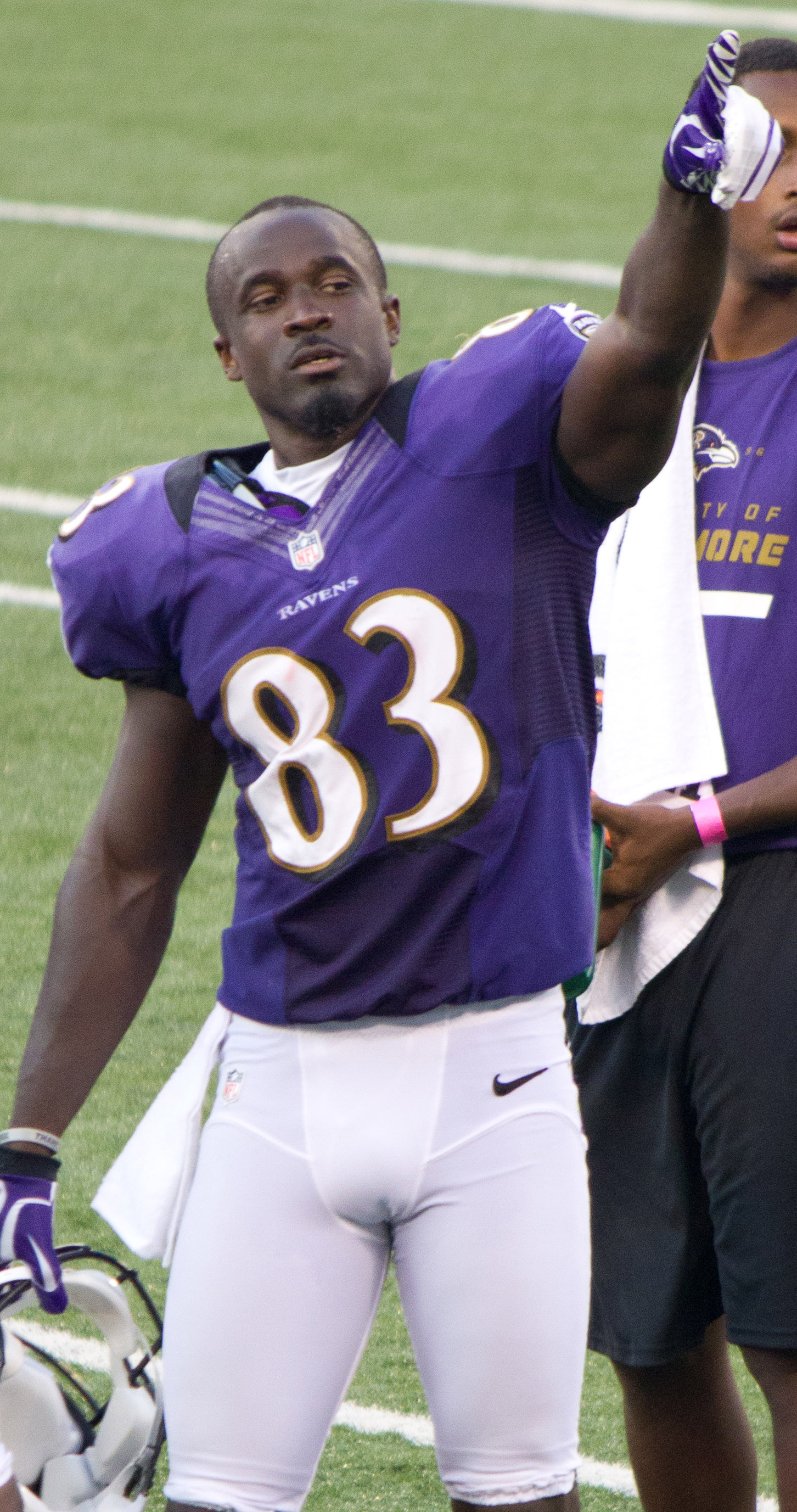
- Thompson with the Baltimore Ravens in 2012

No. 83, 80, 14, 10, 15
- Positions: Wide receiver Kick returner

Personal information
- Born: February 14, 1989 (age 37); Belle Glade, Florida, U.S.
- Listed height: 6 ft 0 in (1.83 m)
- Listed weight: 204 lb (93 kg)

Career information
- High school: Glades Central (Belle Glade)
- College: Florida
- NFL draft: 2012: undrafted

Career history
- Baltimore Ravens (2012−2014); Buffalo Bills (2014); Chicago Bears (2015–2017); Buffalo Bills (2017); Dallas Cowboys (2018); Buffalo Bills (2018); New York Jets (2019)*
- * Offseason or practice squad member only

Awards and highlights
- Super Bowl champion (XLVII); BCS national champion (2009)

Career NFL statistics
- Receptions: 94
- Receiving yards: 1,193
- Receiving touchdowns: 4
- Return yards: 2,179
- Stats at Pro Football Reference

Deonte Thompson (born February 14, 1989) is an American former professional football player who was a wide receiver in the National Football League (NFL). He played college football for the Florida Gators and was a member of their 2009 BCS National Championship team. Thompson was signed by the Baltimore Ravens as an undrafted free agent in 2012.

== Early life ==
Thompson was born in the small agricultural town of Belle Glade, Florida. He attended Glades Central High School in Belle Glade, where he played for the Glades Central Raiders high school football team. As a senior in 2006, he helped lead the Raiders to a Class 3A state football championship with 30 receptions for 504 yards and eight touchdowns, despite missing five games with a foot injury. In the state championship game, he rushed for 82 yards and two touchdowns.

Thompson also ran in the 100-meter and 200-meter events for the Glades Central track and field team. He won the 100 meters at the 2007 Western Conference Meet, with a career-best time of 10.47 seconds. In the finals of the 2007 FHSAA 2A Region 4, he earned first place in both the 100 meters and the 200 meters. He ran a career-best time of 21.29 seconds in the 200 meters as a senior.

== College career ==
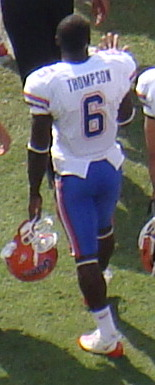
Thompson with the Florida Gators in 2008

Thompson accepted a football scholarship to attend the University of Florida, to play under head coach Urban Meyer and coach Will Muschamp's Florida Gators football teams from 2008 to 2011. After red-shirting for the 2007 season, he played in every game in 2008 – a season which culminated in the Gators winning the BCS National Championship.

In 2010, his most productive year, he had 38 receptions, 570 receiving yards, and a touchdown as a junior. As a senior in 2011, he compiled 21 receptions, 264 receiving yards and a touchdown. In four seasons, he totaled 101 catches for 1,446 yards and nine touchdowns.

He was also a member of the Gators track and field team. He placed fifth in the 60-meter dash at the 2009 Tyson Invitational with a time of 6.80 seconds.

== Professional career ==
Pre-draft measurables
Height	Weight	Arm length	Hand span	40-yard dash	10-yard split	20-yard split	20-yard shuttle	Three-cone drill	Vertical jump	Broad jump	Bench press
5 ft 11 3/4 in (1.82 m)	198 lb (90 kg)	31 1/2 in (0.80 m)	9 1/4 in (0.23 m)	4.31 s	1.50 s	2.51 s	4.40 s	6.96 s	36.5 in (0.93 m)	10 ft 5 in (3.18 m)	20 reps
All values from Central Florida Pro Day

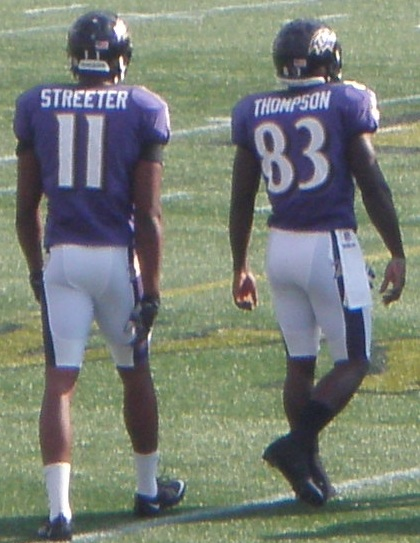
Thompson (right) and Tommy Streeter at Navy–Marine Corps Memorial Stadium in 2012.

=== Baltimore Ravens ===
Thompson was signed as an undrafted free agent by the Baltimore Ravens after the 2012 NFL draft.

He made the team and caught five passes in the regular season, and handled kick return duties for the first five games. Thompson had his best game as a wide receiver in Week 4 of the 2013 season when he caught four passes for 50 yards.

=== Buffalo Bills (first stint) ===
On December 8, 2014, Thompson was signed by the Buffalo Bills. On September 4, 2015, he was waived-injured by the Bills. On September 11, 2015, Thompson was released by the Bills with an injury settlement.

=== Chicago Bears ===
On September 22, 2015, Thompson was signed by the Chicago Bears to the practice squad. On November 10, Thompson was promoted to the active roster.

Thompson re-signed with the Bears on a one-year contract on March 24, 2016. On November 27, Thompson caught five catches for 44 yards and a touchdown against the Tennessee Titans. He recorded his first career touchdown, which was a 6-yard reception from Matt Barkley in the fourth quarter. On December 18, Thompson caught eight passes for a career-high 110 yards against the Green Bay Packers. He recorded his first 100-yard game of his career.

On March 21, 2017, Thompson re-signed with the Bears. In Week 2 of the 2017 season, Thompson recorded four receptions for 57 yards and his first touchdown of the 2017 season in the 29–7 loss to the Tampa Bay Buccaneers. Thompson was released by the Bears on October 11.

=== Buffalo Bills (second stint) ===
On October 17, 2017, Thompson signed with the Bills. In his regular season debut with the Bills against the Tampa Bay Buccaneers on October 22, he caught four passes for 107 yards, including a crucial 44 yard pass in the fourth quarter that set up the game-tying touchdown. He also caught a 34-yard pass during a blizzard game against the Indianapolis Colts to set up LeSean McCoy's game-winning touchdown in overtime. Thompson finished the season with career highs in receptions, targets, and receiving yards, also helping Buffalo make the playoffs for the first time since 1999.

=== Dallas Cowboys ===
On March 22, 2018, Thompson signed as a free agent with the Dallas Cowboys, receiving a $1,000,000 signing bonus and reuniting with new wide receivers coach Sanjay Lal, who had him with the Bills in 2015. He was limited with an Achilles strain from the start of training camp and worked back into practice for the last 2 preseason games. He was waived on September 1, in order to protect wide receiver Noah Brown from waivers. Thompson was re-signed after Brown was placed on the injured reserve list on September 3. Thompson was expected to be a starter as part of a wide-receiver-by-committee approach, that was put in place after the Cowboys released their main wide receiver Dez Bryant on April 13.

He was named a starter alongside Terrance Williams in the season opener against the Carolina Panthers, making 3 receptions for 27 yards. He repeated as a starter in the second game, tallying 4 receptions for 33 yards. He started in the fourth game but didn't have any receptions. He started in the fifth game and had 2 receptions for 19 yards. In the sixth game he returned to a reserve role, after being passed on the depth chart by rookie Michael Gallup. On October 22, the Cowboys traded a 2019 first round draft choice to the Oakland Raiders in exchange for Amari Cooper, to take over the number one receiver role, which also limited Thompson's targets moving forward. He was released on November 9.

=== Buffalo Bills (third stint) ===
Thompson was signed by the Bills on November 14, 2018. He was declared inactive with a toe injury in the season finale against the Miami Dolphins. He wasn't re-signed after the season.

=== New York Jets ===
Thompson was signed by the New York Jets on May 21, 2019. He was released on August 31, 2019.

== See also ==
- List of Florida Gators in the NFL draft
