= Snow Bowl (2017) =

Notable NFL game played in blizzard conditions

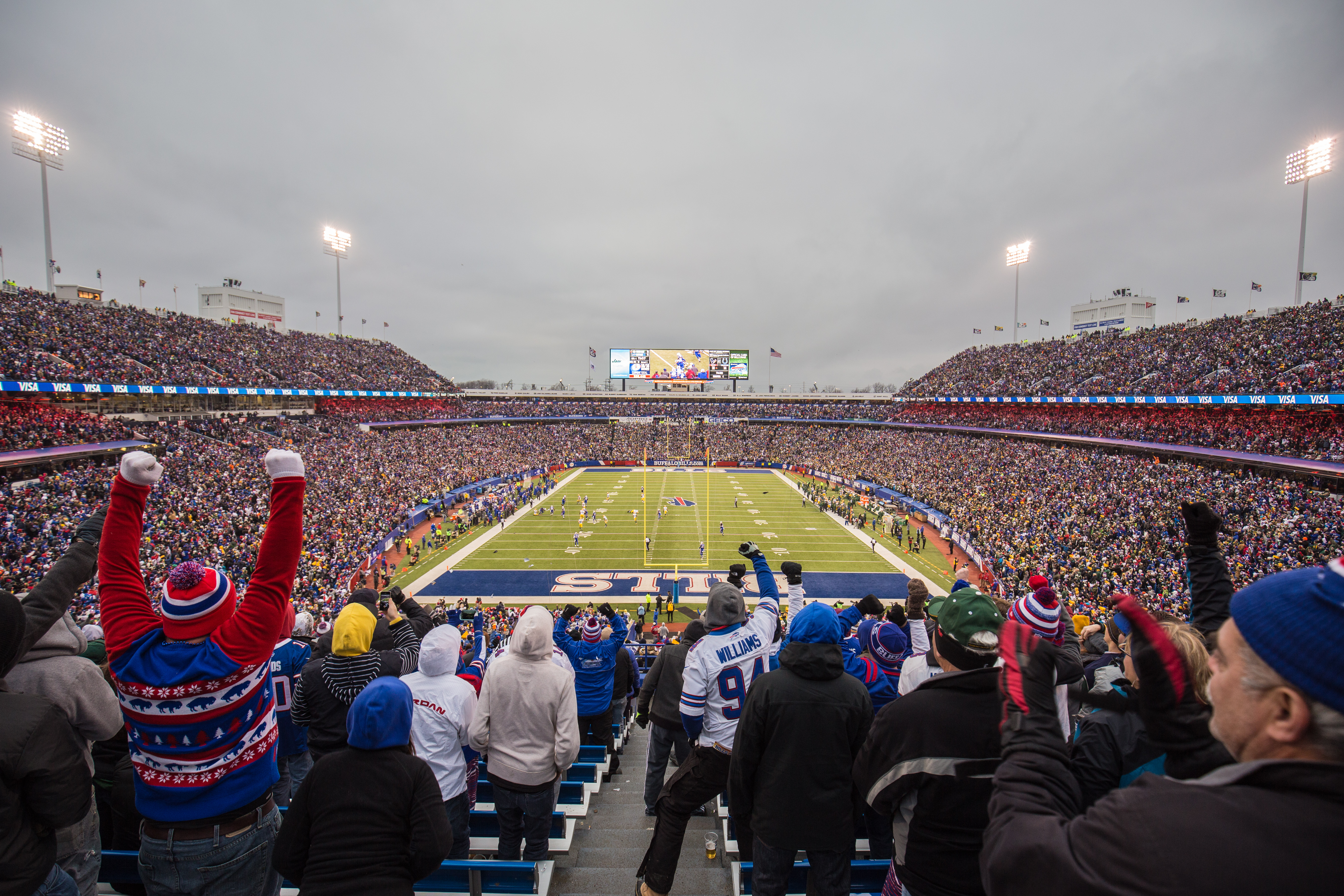
- Highmark Stadium, the site of the game, during a less snowy December home game
Indianapolis Colts (3–9)	Buffalo Bills (6–6)
7	13
Head coach: Chuck Pagano	Head coach: Sean McDermott
	1	2	3	4	OT	Total
IND	0	0	0	7	0	7
BUF	0	7	0	0	6	13
- Date: December 10, 2017
- Stadium: New Era Field; Orchard Park, New York
- Favorite: Buffalo by 3.5
- Referee: Brad Allen
- Attendance: 60,222

TV in the United States
- Network: CBS
- Announcers: Spero Dedes, Adam Archuleta, and Steve Tasker

Radio in the United States
- Announcers: John Murphy and Mark Kelso (Bills); Bob Lamey, Jim Sorgi, and Matt Taylor (Colts); Tom McCarthy and Ross Tucker (Westwood One)

The Snow Bowl, also referred to as Snowvertime, was a National Football League game played on December 10, 2017, between the Indianapolis Colts and Buffalo Bills at Highmark Stadium (then named "New Era Field") in Orchard Park, New York. It is notable for being held in the midst of a heavy lake-effect snow storm that ultimately dumped 16.7 inches (42 cm) of snow in Orchard Park, with 8 to 9 inches (20 to 23 cm) falling during the game alone. The Bills won the game in overtime and improved to 7–6 on their way to snapping the franchise's 17-year playoff drought, while the loss for the Colts, who had already clinched a losing season, officially eliminated them from playoff contention.

== Significance of weather conditions ==
Buffalo is notorious for its lake-effect snow, with one storm in 2014 dropping 7 feet of snow on the site of Highmark Stadium (then named Ralph Wilson Stadium), forcing the rescheduling of a game against the New York Jets. However, the Bills-Colts game went on as scheduled despite this particular storm. The heavy snow and strong winds caused severe complications, making it difficult for CBS to televise the game due to low visibility. CBS producer Jim Cornell described working the game "worse than what you saw on television" and was unable to see a yard marker on the field. The camera team and reporters worked to improvise finding the best way to televise the game, with several cameras having little to no visibility of the field. (Because it was a regional telecast, CBS did not bring a skycam, which NBC uses during situations where fog, rain or snow may obscure traditional views.) Sideline reporter and former Bills player Steve Tasker mentioned working a game between the Bills and the Cleveland Browns in 2007 with similarly snowy conditions, but stated that throughout his 11-year tenure with the Bills and many more covering them as a reporter, he had "never seen the franchise play a game in these conditions." Visibility of the game finally cleared up by the time the game reached overtime.

In terms of how gameplay was affected, the weather conditions also prompted both teams to run the ball far more often and make more fourth-down conversion attempts than would otherwise have been attempted, since kicking the ball was less reliable. Neither team passed much due to the sheer amount of snowfall during the game. In addition, both teams had to call timeouts simply to clear snow off the field for their placekickers to attempt field goals or extra points. The amount of snow on the ground did prove to be an advantage for the punters, since the ball did not bounce upon landing, making precision coffin corner punts easier. Buffalo, in a rarity for a Sunday afternoon game, wore their all-red Color Rush jerseys, while Indianapolis wore their all-white road uniforms.

Weather conditions suppressed attendance at the game; scalpers at the event noted that they had sold no tickets, a rarity. In contrast, because the league had lifted its blackout restrictions two years prior, fans were free to watch the game from home on their television sets; a majority of television sets in Western New York were tuned into the game telecast on WIVB-TV, the local CBS affiliate. The Nielsen Ratings for the game were the highest for any regular-season game in Bills history.

== Game summary ==
Colts QB Jacoby Brissett attempts a pass to RB Marlon Mack through heavy snow during the second quarter

The game saw Bills rookie quarterback Nathan Peterman make his second start of the season with starter Tyrod Taylor injured. During the Colts' first drive of the game, Adam Vinatieri missed a 33-yard field goal due to the heavy snow and wind. As a result, both teams would choose to attempt a fourth-down conversion rather than a field goal. The Bills broke the scoreless tie in the second quarter with an 8-yard touchdown pass from Peterman to Kelvin Benjamin. Despite the poor weather conditions, Peterman was able to post a more respectable performance, compared to his five-interception first-half performance during a week 11 matchup against the Los Angeles Chargers, before leaving in the third quarter with a concussion. With under two minutes to play in the fourth quarter, the Colts scored their first points of the game on a 3-yard touchdown pass from Jacoby Brissett to Jack Doyle with Vinatieri barely hooking in the extra point attempt, which had been pushed back after a successful two-point conversion was called back due to an offensive pass interference penalty. The Indianapolis defense intercepted the Bills' third-string quarterback, Joe Webb, on the following drive. With only seconds left in the fourth quarter, Vinatieri missed a game-winning field goal attempt from a distance similar to the extra point he had made minutes earlier.

The low-scoring game went into overtime, with the teams trading punts on multiple possessions. It did not end until Webb connected with receiver Deonte Thompson for 34 yards on an improbable pass play, which set up a LeSean McCoy rushing touchdown with under two minutes to go in the extra period to seal the game for the Bills. McCoy finished with a strong performance, rushing for 156 yards on 32 carries and the aforementioned touchdown despite a lack of traction on the field. He had previously played under similar weather conditions during his time with the Philadelphia Eagles and had performed similarly well during a blizzard game against the Detroit Lions, in which he rushed for over 200 yards and two scores. In a post game interview, McCoy commented: "Being a Pennsylvania kid, I played in the snow before. You knew it was going to be one of those games where we were going to run the ball and pound it." Colts running back Frank Gore also set a career high for carries in a game, with 36 carries.

== Aftermath ==
With the win, the Bills improved to 7–6 on the season, keeping its playoff chances alive and paving the way to breaking its league-leading playoff drought later in 2017. Bills head coach Sean McDermott was later criticized for his decision to punt from the Colts' 42-yard line on fourth and one in overtime, as a tie-game would have been as detrimental as a loss for the Bills' chances. This was coming after previous Bills head coach Rex Ryan opted to punt in a similar situation against the Miami Dolphins the year prior, which ultimately cost the Bills that game and playoff contention when the Dolphins won the game with a field goal on the ensuing drive. However, McDermott defended his decision, citing concerns about field position had a fourth-down attempt failed, and it ultimately worked out for the Bills.

The loss dropped the Colts to 3–10 on the season and mathematically eliminated the team from the playoffs. The Colts ultimately finished tied for last place in the AFC South at 4–12 and out of the playoffs for the third straight year, leading to the firing of longtime head coach Chuck Pagano after the season.

A new rule was added in the following offseason due to an incident in this game. Colts sideline attendants attempted to clear a spot for a field goal attempt during a timeout. Referee Brad Allen immediately halted the practice and warned the Colts sideline that this was not permitted. The protocol, which was written in the gameday operations manual, was to handle such a situation with a warning first; the act had been illegal ever since the Snowplow Game 35 years prior. By adding it to the rulebook, clearing snow for a field goal placement by anyone other than the players on the field became a 15-yard unsportsmanlike conduct foul on the first offense.

== Statistics ==
2017 Week Fourteen: Indianapolis Colts at Buffalo Bills – Game summary

Quarter	1	2	3	4	OT	Total
Colts	0	0	0	7	0	7
Bills	0	7	0	0	6	13

at Highmark Stadium, Orchard Park, New York

- Date: December 10
- Game time: 1:00 p.m.
- Game weather: 32 °F (0 °C), heavy lake effect snow
- Game attendance: 60,222
- Referee: Brad Allen
- TV announcers (CBS): Spero Dedes, Adam Archuleta and Steve Tasker
- Recap, Gamebook

Game information

First quarter

- No scoring plays.

Second quarter

- BUF – Kelvin Benjamin 8-yard pass from Nathan Peterman (Steven Hauschka kick), 0:27. Bills 7–0. Drive: 7 plays, 80 yards, 1:15.

Third quarter

- No scoring plays.

Fourth quarter

- IND – Jack Doyle 3-yard pass from Jacoby Brissett (Adam Vinatieri kick), 1:16. Tied 7–7. Drive: 19 plays, 77 yards, 9:53.

Overtime

- BUF – LeSean McCoy 21-yard run, 1:33. Bills 13–7. Drive: 6 plays, 65 yards, 0:52.

Top passers

- IND – Jacoby Brissett – 11/22, 69 yards, TD
- BUF – Nathan Peterman – 5/10, 57 yards, TD

Top rushers

- IND – Frank Gore – 36 rushes, 130 yards
- BUF – LeSean McCoy – 32 rushes, 156 yards, TD

Top receivers

- IND – Marlon Mack – 2 receptions, 21 yards
- BUF – Kelvin Benjamin – 3 receptions, 38 yards, TD

== Officials ==
- Referee: Brad Allen (#122)
- Umpire: Fred Bryan (#11)
- Down judge: Jim Mello (#48)
- Line judge: Brian Bolinger (#40)
- Back judge: Shawn Hochuli (#83)
- Side judge: Jabir Walker (#26)
- Field judge: Tom Hill (#97)
- Replay official: Jim Lapentina

== See also ==
- Ice Bowl (disambiguation)
- Fog Bowl (disambiguation)
- Mud Bowl (disambiguation)
