= 2017 Indianapolis Colts season =

65th season in franchise history

- Owner: Jim Irsay
- General manager: Chris Ballard
- Head coach: Chuck Pagano
- Home stadium: Lucas Oil Stadium

Results
- Record: 4–12
- Division place: 3rd AFC South
- Playoffs: Did not qualify
- Pro Bowlers: WR T. Y. Hilton; TE Jack Doyle

Uniform
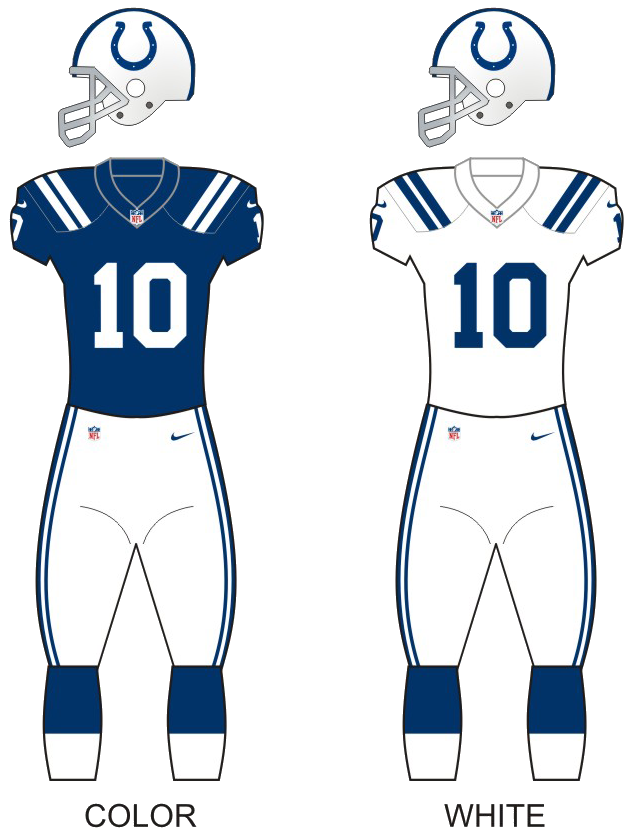

The 2017 season was the Indianapolis Colts' 65th in the National Football League (NFL), the 34th in Indianapolis and the tenth playing their home game at Lucas Oil Stadium. It was also the sixth and final season under head coach Chuck Pagano, who was fired at the end of the season. It was also the first under new general manager Chris Ballard, the former Kansas City Chiefs' Director of Football Operations, following the dismissal of Ryan Grigson. The Colts were looking to improve on their 8–8 record from last year and make the playoffs for the first time since 2014. However, star quarterback Andrew Luck suffered a shoulder injury before the regular season began, was placed on the injured reserve list, and missed the remainder of the season that paralleled the 2011 season, when then-starting quarterback Peyton Manning sat out the entire season to undergo neck surgeries and coincidentally, the Colts lost at least 12 games.

After an ineffective performance by backup Scott Tolzien in Week 1 against the Rams, the Colts put Jacoby Brissett as their starting quarterback for the rest of the season. However, Brissett could not save the team as they finished 4–12 for their first losing season since 2011, and missed the playoffs for the third consecutive season.

== Roster changes ==
=== Free agents ===
Position	Player	Tag	2017 Team	Notes
S	Mike Adams	UFA	Carolina Panthers	signed on March 10
WR	Quan Bray	ERFA	Indianapolis Colts	signed on April 17
CB	Darius Butler	UFA	Indianapolis Colts	signed on March 17
OLB	Chris Carter	UFA	Washington Redskins	signed on March 16
OLB	Trent Cole	UFA		
TE	Jack Doyle	UFA	Indianapolis Colts	signed on March 7
C	Jonotthan Harrison	RFA	New York Jets	signed on March 28
DE	Zach Kerr	RFA	Denver Broncos	signed on March 12
OLB	Robert Mathis	UFA	Retired	
P	Pat McAfee	UFA	Retired	
ILB	Josh McNary	RFA	Jacksonville Jaguars	signed on March 16
OT	Joe Reitz	UFA	Retired	
TE	Erik Swoope	ERFA	Indianapolis Colts	signed on April 17
G	Hugh Thornton	UFA	Atlanta Falcons	signed on March 28
RB	Jordan Todman	UFA	New York Jets	signed on June 13
RB	Robert Turbin	UFA	Indianapolis Colts	signed on March 13
OLB	Erik Walden	UFA	Tennessee Titans	signed on July 27

Player re-signed by the Colts	Player signed with a different team	Player retired

=== Draft ===
2017 Indianapolis Colts Draft
Round	Selection	Player	Position	College
1	15	Malik Hooker	FS	Ohio State
2	46	Quincy Wilson	CB	Florida
3	80	Tarell Basham	OLB	Ohio
4	137	Zach Banner	OT	USC
4	143	Marlon Mack	RB	South Florida
4	144	Grover Stewart	DT	Albany State
5	158	Nate Hairston	CB	Temple
5	161	Anthony Walker Jr.	ILB	Northwestern

Notes

- The Colts received one compensatory selection — No. 144 overall.
- The Colts traded their seventh-round selection (No. 233 overall) to the Cleveland Browns in exchange for defensive end Billy Winn.
- The Colts traded Dwayne Allen and their sixth-round selection (No. 200 overall) to the New England Patriots for their fourth-round selection (No. 137 overall).

=== Undrafted free agents ===
Position	Player	College	Notes
OG	Deyshawn Bond	Cincinnati	made final roster, placed on injured reserve October 3
RB	Dalton Crossan	New Hampshire	waived August 15
TE	Darrell Daniels	Washington	made final roster
WR	Trey Griffey	Arizona	waived June 12
LS	Thomas Hennessy	Duke	traded to the New York Jets August 28
TE	Bug Howard	North Carolina	waived September 2
TE	Colin Jeter	LSU	waived July 30
WR	Jerome Lane	Akron	waived May 15
CB	Chris Lyles	Mississippi College	waived May 15
OG	Christopher Muller	Rutgers	waived May 15
WR	JoJo Natson	Akron	waived September 2
CB	Reggie Porter	Utah	waived June 12
RB	Brandon Radcliff	Louisville	waived June 1
P	Rigoberto Sanchez	Hawaii	made final roster
OLB	Garrett Sickels	Penn State	waived from practice squad September 12
DE	Jhaustin Thomas	Iowa State	waived September 2
OT	Jerry Ugokwe	William & Mary	waived August 2
QB	Phillip Walker	Temple	added to practice squad September 3

== Staff ==
2017 Indianapolis Colts staff
Front office: Owner/CEO – Jim Irsay; General manager – Chris Ballard; Co-vice president of player personnel – Rex Hogan; Co-vice president of player personnel – Ed Dodds; Senior player personnel scout – Todd Vasvari; Director of football administration – Mike Bluem; Director of pro personnel – Kevin Rogers Jr.; Director of college scouting – Morocco Brown; Assistant director of college scouting – Matt Tarpening; Player personnel strategist – Brian Decker; Head coaches: Head coach – Chuck Pagano; Assistant head coach/offensive line – Joe Philbin; Offensive coaches: Offensive coordinator – Rob Chudzinski; Quarterbacks – Brian Schottenheimer; Running backs – Jemal Singleton; Wide receivers – Sanjay Lal; Tight ends – Jim Hostler; Assistant offensive line – Joe Gilbert; Offensive assistant/assistant quarterbacks coach – Tim Berbenich; Offensive quality control – Frank Giufre	Defensive coaches: Defensive coordinator – Ted Monachino; Defensive line – Gary Emanuel; Linebackers – Jim Herrmann; Outside linebackers – Brad White; Pass rush consultant – Robert Mathis; Secondary –Greg Williams; Defensive assistant – Shawn Terlecky; Defensive quality control – Jeff Popovich; Special teams coaches: Special teams coordinator – Tom McMahon; Assistant special teams – Maurice Drayton; Strength and conditioning: Strength and conditioning – Darren Krein; Assistant strength and conditioning – Richard Howell; Conditioning & performance analyst – Quadrian Banks

== Final roster ==
2017 Indianapolis Colts roster
Quarterbacks (QB): 7 Jacoby Brissett; 9 Brad Kaaya; 16 Scott Tolzien; Running backs (RB): 39 Josh Ferguson; 23 Frank Gore; 34 Matt Jones; 25 Marlon Mack; Wide receivers (WR): 17 Kamar Aiken; 15 K. J. Brent; 13 T. Y. Hilton; 10 Donte Moncrief; 80 Chester Rogers; Tight ends (TE): 47 Darrell Daniels; 84 Jack Doyle; 48 Ross Travis; 45 Jason Vander Laan	Offensive linemen (OL): 65 Tyreek Burwell T; 74 Anthony Castonzo T; 62 Le'Raven Clark G/T; 61 Anthony Fabiano C; 64 Mark Glowinski G; 71 Denzelle Good T; 73 Joe Haeg T/G; 72 Mike Person C; 67 Jeremy Vujnovich G; Defensive linemen (DL): 58 Tarell Basham DE; 95 Johnathan Hankins DT; 92 Margus Hunt DE; 97 Anthony Johnson DE; 94 Joey Mbu DT; 68 Caraun Reid DE; 91 Hassan Ridgeway DT; 93 Jabaal Sheard DE; 90 Grover Stewart DT; 99 Al Woods DT	Linebackers (LB): 59 Jeremiah George MLB; 52 Barkevious Mingo OLB; 44 Antonio Morrison MLB; 56 Jermaine Grace MLB; 50 Anthony Walker OLB; Defensive backs (DB): 20 Darius Butler FS/CB; 41 Matthias Farley SS; 26 Clayton Geathers FS; 32 T. J. Green S; 27 Nate Hairston CB; 40 Ronald Martin SS; 28 Christopher Milton CB; 42 Kenny Moore CB; 37 D. J. White CB; 31 Quincy Wilson CB; Special teams (ST): 46 Luke Rhodes LS; 2 Rigoberto Sanchez P; 4 Adam Vinatieri K	Practice squad: 43 Mo Alie-Cox TE; 83 Dres Anderson WR; 56 Johnathan Calvin DT; 79 Andreas Knappe T; 14 Kolby Listenbee WR; 55 Arthur Miley DE; 49 Joshua Perry OLB; 36 Denzel Rice CB; 8 P. J. Walker QB; 63 Isaiah Williams G; Reserve: 96 Henry Anderson DE (IR); 69 Deyshawn Bond C (IR); 57 Jon Bostic OLB (IR); 35 Pierre Desir CB (IR); 81 Krishawn Hogan WR (IR); 29 Malik Hooker FS (IR); 53 Edwin Jackson OLB (IR); 78 Ryan Kelly C (IR); 12 Andrew Luck QB (IR); 30 Rashaan Melvin CB (IR); 75 Jack Mewhort G (IR); 38 Christine Michael RB (IR); 51 John Simon OLB (IR); 86 Erik Swoope TE (IR); 33 Robert Turbin RB (IR); 85 Brandon Williams TE (IR); 37 George Winn RB (IR); Rookies in italics 53 active, 17 reserve, 10 practice squad

== Preseason ==
Week	Date	Opponent	Result	Record	Venue	Recap
1	August 13	Detroit Lions	L 10–24	0–1	Lucas Oil Stadium	Recap
2	August 19	at Dallas Cowboys	L 19–24	0–2	AT&T Stadium	Recap
3	August 26	at Pittsburgh Steelers	W 19–15	1–2	Heinz Field	Recap
4	August 31	Cincinnati Bengals	W 7–6	2–2	Lucas Oil Stadium	Recap

== Regular season ==
=== Schedule ===
Week	Date	Opponent	Result	Record	Venue	Recap
1	September 10	at Los Angeles Rams	**L** 9–46	0–1	Los Angeles Memorial Coliseum	Recap
2	September 17	Arizona Cardinals	**L** 13–16 (OT)	0–2	Lucas Oil Stadium	Recap
3	September 24	Cleveland Browns	**W** 31–28	1–2	Lucas Oil Stadium	Recap
4	October 1	at Seattle Seahawks	**L** 18–46	1–3	CenturyLink Field	Recap
5	October 8	San Francisco 49ers	**W** 26–23 (OT)	2–3	Lucas Oil Stadium	Recap
6	October 16	at **Tennessee Titans**	**L** 22–36	2–4	Nissan Stadium	Recap
7	October 22	**Jacksonville Jaguars**	**L** 0–27	2–5	Lucas Oil Stadium	Recap
8	October 29	at Cincinnati Bengals	**L** 23–24	2–6	Paul Brown Stadium	Recap
9	November 5	at **Houston Texans**	**W** 20–14	3–6	NRG Stadium	Recap
10	November 12	Pittsburgh Steelers	**L** 17–20	3–7	Lucas Oil Stadium	Recap
11	Bye					
12	November 26	**Tennessee Titans**	**L** 16–20	3–8	Lucas Oil Stadium	Recap
13	December 3	at **Jacksonville Jaguars**	**L** 10–30	3–9	EverBank Field	Recap
14	December 10	at Buffalo Bills	**L** 7–13 (OT)	3–10	New Era Field	Recap
15	December 14	Denver Broncos	**L** 13–25	3–11	Lucas Oil Stadium	Recap
16	December 23	at Baltimore Ravens	**L** 16–23	3–12	M&T Bank Stadium	Recap
17	December 31	**Houston Texans**	**W** 22–13	4–12	Lucas Oil Stadium	Recap

Note: Intra-division opponents are in bold text.

=== Game summaries ===
==== Week 1: at Los Angeles Rams ====
Week One: Indianapolis Colts at Los Angeles Rams – Game summary

Quarter	1	2	3	4	Total
Colts	3	0	0	6	**9**
**Rams**	10	17	10	9	**46**

at Los Angeles Memorial Coliseum, Los Angeles, California

- Date: September 10
- Game time: 4:05 p.m. EDT/1:05 p.m. PDT
- Game weather: 90 °F (32 °C), sunny
- Game attendance: 60,128
- Referee: Ronald Torbert
- TV announcers (CBS): Ian Eagle, Dan Fouts and Evan Washburn
- Recap, Gamebook

Game information

**First quarter**

- LAR – Greg Zuerlein 50-yard field goal, 12:48. Rams 3–0. **Drive: 7 plays, 43 yards, 2:17.**
- LAR – Trumaine Johnson 39-yard interception return (Greg Zuerlein kick), 11:10. Rams 10–0. **Drive: 0 plays, 39 yards, 0:00.**
- IND – Adam Vinatieri 20-yard field goal, 6:25. Rams 10–3. **Drive: 9 plays, 73 yards, 4:49.**

**Second quarter**

- LAR – Todd Gurley 5-yard run (Greg Zuerlein kick), 9:44. Rams 17–3. **Drive: 5 plays, 69 yards, 2:12.**
- LAR – Cooper Kupp 18-yard pass from Jared Goff (Greg Zuerlein kick), 5:27. Rams 24–3. **Drive: 6 plays, 58 yards, 2:09.**
- LAR – Greg Zuerlein 35-yard field goal, 0:22. Rams 27–3. **Drive: 6 plays, 43 yards, 2:51.**

**Third quarter**

- LAR – Greg Zuerlein 44-yard field goal, 7:28. Rams 30–3. **Drive: 8 plays, 46 yards, 4:40.**
- LAR – Lamarcus Joyner 29-yard interception return (Greg Zuerlein kick), 7:23. Rams 37–3. **Drive: 0 plays, 29 yards, 0:00.**

**Fourth quarter**

- IND – Marlon Mack 3-yard run (kick failed), 11:36. Rams 37–9. **Drive: 5 plays, 84 yards, 2:41.**
- LAR – Jacoby Brissett tackled in the end zone by Morgan Fox for a safety, 9:29. Rams 39–9.
- LAR – Malcolm Brown 3-yard run (Greg Zuerlein kick), 4:33. Rams 46–9. **Drive: 8 plays, 57 yards, 4:50.**

**Top passers**

- IND – Scott Tolzien – 9/18, 128 yards, 2 INT
- LAR – Jared Goff – 21/29, 306 yards, TD

**Top rushers**

- IND – Frank Gore – 10 rushes, 42 yards
- LAR – Todd Gurley – 19 rushes, 40 yards, TD

**Top receivers**

- IND – T. Y. Hilton – 3 receptions, 57 yards
- LAR – Cooper Kupp – 4 receptions, 76 yards, TD

**Top tacklers**

- IND – Matthias Farley – 8 Tackles, 2 Assists
- LAR – Michael Brockers – 3 Tackles, 2 Assists

The first regular season game of the Colts ended in disaster. The offense allowed two pick-sixes and a safety, the defense were unable to stop Sean McVay's high-powered Rams offense, and the special teams missed one field goal.

==== Week 2: vs. Arizona Cardinals ====
Week Two: Arizona Cardinals at Indianapolis Colts – Game summary

Quarter	1	2	3	4	OT	Total
**Cardinals**	0	3	0	10	3	**16**
Colts	10	0	0	3	0	**13**

at Lucas Oil Stadium, Indianapolis, Indiana

- Date: September 17
- Game time: 1:00 p.m. EDT
- Game weather: Played indoors (retractable roof closed)
- Game attendance: 63,137
- Referee: Carl Cheffers
- TV announcers (Fox): Chris Myers, Daryl Johnston and Laura Okmin
- Recap, Gamebook

Game information

**First quarter**

- IND – Frank Gore 5-yard run (Adam Vinatieri kick), 7:38. Colts 7–0. **Drive: 14 plays, 53 yards, 5:45.**
- IND – Adam Vinatieri 46-yard field goal, 1:27. Colts 10–0. **Drive: 8 plays, 32 yards, 4:21.**

**Second quarter**

- ARI – Phil Dawson 27-yard field goal, 5:56. Colts 10–3. **Drive: 15 plays, 54 yards, 5:49.**

**Third quarter**

- No scoring plays

**Fourth quarter**

- IND – Adam Vinatieri 29-yard field goal, 11:42, Colts 13–3. **Drive: 16 plays, 76 yards, 9:18.**
- ARI – J. J. Nelson 45-yard pass from Carson Palmer (Phil Dawson kick), 7:38. Colts 13–10. **Drive: 7 plays, 85 yards, 4:04.**
- ARI – Phil Dawson 40-yard field goal, 3:25. Tied 13–13. **Drive: 6 plays, 40 yards, 2:09.**

**Overtime**

- ARI – Phil Dawson 30-yard field goal, 8:02. Cardinals 16–13. **Drive: 4 plays, 9 yards, 1:45.**

**Top passers**

- ARI – Carson Palmer – 19/36, 332 yards, TD, INT
- IND – Jacoby Brissett – 20/37, 216 yards, INT

**Top rushers**

- ARI – Chris Johnson – 11 carries, 44 yards
- IND – Frank Gore – 14 carries, 46 yards, TD

**Top receivers**

- ARI – J. J. Nelson – 5 receptions, 120 yards, TD
- IND – Jack Doyle – 8 receptions, 79 yards

The Colts allowed 2 Phil Dawson field goals late in the game, with the 2nd one turning out to be the game winner. The 2nd one came after a Jacoby Brissett interception on the first play of overtime. The Colts fell to 0–2, their third straight such start.

==== Week 3: vs. Cleveland Browns ====
Week Three: Cleveland Browns at Indianapolis Colts – Game summary

Quarter	1	2	3	4	Total
Browns	0	14	0	14	**28**
**Colts**	7	21	0	3	**31**

at Lucas Oil Stadium, Indianapolis, Indiana

- Date: September 24
- Game time: 1:00 p.m. EDT
- Game weather: Played indoors (retractable roof closed)
- Game attendance: 63,351
- Referee: Ed Hochuli
- TV announcers (CBS): Beth Mowins and Jay Feely
- Recap, Gamebook

Game information

**First quarter**

- IND – Jacoby Brissett 5-yard run (Adam Vinatieri kick), 0:24. Colts 7–0. **Drive: 10 plays, 70 yards, 4:13.**

**Second quarter**

- CLE – Duke Johnson 19-yard run (Zane Gonzalez kick), 13:22. Tied 7–7. **Drive: 5 plays, 75 yards, 2:02.**
- IND – Jacoby Brissett 7-yard run (Adam Vinatieri kick), 10:06. Colts 14–7. **Drive: 6 plays, 75 yards, 3:16.**
- IND – T. Y. Hilton 61-yard pass from Jacoby Brissett (Adam Vinatieri kick), 5:14. Colts 21–7. **Drive: 5 plays, 97 yards, 1:57.**
- IND – Frank Gore 4-yard run (Adam Vinatieri kick), 2:41. Colts 28–7. **Drive: 3 plays, 45 yards, 1:26.**
- CLE – David Njoku 1-yard pass from DeShone Kizer (Zane Gonzalez kick), 0:27. Colts 28–14. **Drive: 10 plays, 75 yards, 2:14.**

**Third quarter**

- No scoring plays

**Fourth quarter**

- IND – Adam Vinatieri 33-yard field goal, 10:18. Colts 31–14. **Drive: 10 plays, 34 yards, 4:53.**
- CLE – Kenny Britt 11-yard pass from DeShone Kizer (Zane Gonzalez kick), 6:56. Colts 31–21. **Drive: 5 plays, 58 yards, 1:52.**
- CLE – DeShone Kizer 1-yard run (Zane Gonzalez kick), 2:04. Colts 31–28. **Drive: 11 plays, 70 yards, 2:01.**

**Top passers**

- CLE – DeShone Kizer – 22/47, 242 yards, 2 TD, 3 INT
- IND – Jacoby Brissett – 17/24, 259 yards, TD

**Top rushers**

- CLE – DeShone Kizer – 7 carries, 44 yards, TD
- IND – Frank Gore – 25 carries, 57 yards, TD

**Top receivers**

- CLE – Duke Johnson – 6 receptions, 81 yards
- IND – T. Y. Hilton – 7 receptions, 153 yards, TD

In a battle of 0–2 teams, the Colts took a 28–14 lead at halftime, then halted a Browns comeback in the second half. The Colts improved to 1–2.

==== Week 4: at Seattle Seahawks ====
Week Four: Indianapolis Colts at Seattle Seahawks – Game summary

Quarter	1	2	3	4	Total
Colts	2	13	3	0	**18**
**Seahawks**	3	7	22	14	**46**

at CenturyLink Field, Seattle, Washington

- Date: October 1
- Game time: 8:30 p.m. EDT/5:30 p.m. PDT
- Game weather: 61 °F (16 °C), clear
- Game attendance: 68,872
- Referee: Brad Allen
- TV announcers (NBC): Al Michaels, Cris Collinsworth and Michele Tafoya
- Recap, Gamebook

Game information

**First quarter**

- SEA – Blair Walsh 44-yard field goal, 8:59. Seahawks 3–0. **Drive: 7 plays, 38 yards, 3:04.**
- IND – Russell Wilson sacked by Nate Hairston in the end zone for a safety, 3:33. Seahawks 3–2.

**Second quarter**

- SEA – Justin Coleman 28-yard interception return (Blair Walsh kick), 12:25. Seahawks 10–2.
- IND – Robert Turbin 1-yard run (pass failed), 5:25. Seahawks 10–8. **Drive: 12 plays, 80 yards, 7:00.**
- IND – Donte Moncrief 18-yard pass from Jacoby Brissett (Adam Vinatieri kick), 0:25. Colts 15–10. **Drive: 9 plays, 55 yards, 3:09.**

**Third quarter**

- SEA – Russell Wilson 23-yard run (Russell Wilson–Doug Baldwin pass), 9:23. Seahawks 18–15. **Drive: 9 plays, 84 yards, 5:37.**
- IND – Adam Vinatieri 40-yard field goal, 4:53. Tied 18–18. **Drive: 4 plays, 2 yards, 0:56.**
- SEA – J. D. McKissic 30-yard run (Blair Walsh kick), 2:12. Seahawks 25–18. **Drive: 6 plays, 75 yards, 2:41.**
- SEA – Bobby Wagner 21-yard fumble return (Blair Walsh kick), 1:59. Seahawks 32–18.

**Fourth quarter**

- SEA – Luke Willson 6-yard pass from Russell Wilson (Blair Walsh kick), 11:16. Seahawks 39–18. **Drive: 9 plays, 74 yards, 4:46.**
- SEA – J. D. McKissic 27-yard pass from Russell Wilson (Blair Walsh kick), 2:22. Seahawks 46–18. **Drive: 11 plays, 84 yards, 6:56.**

**Top passers**

- IND – Jacoby Brissett – 16/29, 157 yards, TD, INT
- SEA – Russell Wilson – 21/26, 295 yards, 2 TD, 2 INT

**Top rushers**

- IND – Frank Gore – 12 rushes, 46 yards
- SEA – Eddie Lacy – 11 rushes, 52 yards

**Top receivers**

- IND – Frank Gore – 3 receptions, 34 yards
- SEA – Tyler Lockett – 4 receptions, 67 yards

**Top tacklers**

- IND – Jon Bostic – 5 solo tackles, 7 assisted
- SEA – Earl Thomas – 4 solo tackles, 3 assisted

Despite being tied at 18 in the 3rd quarter, the Colts allowed 28 straight Seattle points to fall to 1–3.

==== Week 5: vs. San Francisco 49ers ====
Week Five: San Francisco 49ers at Indianapolis Colts – Game summary

Quarter	1	2	3	4	OT	Total
49ers	3	3	0	17	0	**23**
**Colts**	3	3	10	7	3	**26**

at Lucas Oil Stadium, Indianapolis, Indiana

- Date: October 8
- Game time: 1:00 p.m. EDT
- Game weather: Played indoors (retractable roof closed)
- Game attendance: 65,612
- Referee: Walt Coleman
- TV announcers (Fox): Thom Brennaman, Chris Spielman and Peter Schrager
- Recap, Gamebook

Game information

**First quarter**

- IND – Adam Vinatieri 52-yard field goal, 9:09. Colts 3–0. **Drive: 11 plays, 41 yards, 5:51.**
- SF – Robbie Gould 28-yard field goal, 2:37. Tied 3–3. **Drive: 12 plays, 65 yards, 6:32.**

**Second quarter**

- IND – Adam Vinatieri 23-yard field goal, 0:59. Colts 6–3. **Drive: 11 plays, 72 yards, 3:57.**
- SF – Robbie Gould 43-yard field goal, 0:02. Tied 6–6. **Drive: 6 plays, 50 yards, 0:57.**

**Third quarter**

- IND – Adam Vinatieri 38-yard field goal, 7:42. Colts 9–6. **Drive: 10 plays, 30 yards, 5:21.**
- IND – Marlon Mack 22-yard run (Adam Vinatieri kick), 3:17. Colts 16–6. **Drive: 4 plays, 60 yards, 2:33.**

**Fourth quarter**

- SF – Robbie Gould 40-yard field goal, 13:39. Colts 16–9. **Drive: 12 plays, 69 yards, 4:38.**
- IND – Jacoby Brissett 3-yard run (Adam Vinatieri kick), 9:56. Colts 23–9. **Drive: 6 plays, 75 yards, 3:43.**
- SF – Kyle Juszczyk 6-yard pass from Brian Hoyer (Robbie Gould kick), 8:00. Colts 23–16. **Drive: 5 plays, 79 yards, 1:56.**
- SF – George Kittle 5-yard pass from Brian Hoyer (Robbie Gould kick), 0:20. Tied 23–23. **Drive: 14 plays, 89 yards, 5:09.**

**Overtime**

- IND – Adam Vinatieri 51-yard field goal, 1:38. Colts 26–23. **Drive: 8 plays, 49 yards, 2:01.**

**Top passers**

- SF – Brian Hoyer – 29/46, 353 yards, 2 TD
- IND – Jacoby Brissett – 22/34, 314 yards, INT

**Top rushers**

- SF – Matt Breida – 10 carries, 49 yards
- IND – Marlon Mack – 9 carries, 91 yards, TD

**Top receivers**

- SF – Pierre Garçon – 8 receptions, 94 yards
- IND – T. Y. Hilton – 7 receptions, 177 yards

**Top tacklers**

- SF – NaVorro Bowman – 5 Tackles, 5 Assists
- IND – Antonio Morrison – 5 Tackles, 2 Assists and Jon Bostic – 3 Tackles, 4 Assists

Despite allowing the 49ers to rally from a 23–9 deficit in the 2nd half, the Colts won in overtime on an Adam Vinatieri field goal to improve to 2–3 while going 1–3 against the NFC West.

==== Week 6: at Tennessee Titans ====
Week Six: Indianapolis Colts at Tennessee Titans – Game summary

Quarter	1	2	3	4	Total
Colts	3	10	6	3	**22**
**Titans**	6	3	6	21	**36**

at Nissan Stadium, Nashville, Tennessee

- Date: October 16
- Game time: 8:30 p.m. EDT/7:30 p.m. CDT
- Game weather: 57 °F (14 °C), clear
- Game attendance: 63,888
- Referee: Walt Anderson
- TV announcers (ESPN): Sean McDonough, Jon Gruden and Lisa Salters
- Recap, Gamebook

Game information

**First quarter**

- TEN – Ryan Succop 48-yard field goal, 11:15. Titans 3–0. **Drive: 8 plays, 30 yards, 3:45.**
- IND – Adam Vinatieri 36-yard field goal, 6:45. Tied 3–3. **Drive: 9 plays, 52 yards, 4:30.**
- TEN – Ryan Succop 32-yard field goal, 0:47. Titans 6–3. **Drive: 10 plays, 61 yards, 5:58.**

**Second quarter**

- IND – Jack Doyle 8-yard pass from Jacoby Brissett (Adam Vinatieri kick), 10:54. Colts 10–6. **Drive: 9 plays, 73 yards, 4:53.**
- TEN – Ryan Succop 40-yard field goal, 4:10. Colts 10–9. **Drive: 12 plays, 72 yards, 6:44.**
- IND – Adam Vinatieri 25-yard field goal, 0:14. Colts 13–9. **Drive: 12 plays, 69 yards, 3:56.**

**Third quarter**

- IND – John Simon 26-yard interception return (kick failed), 13:50. Colts 19–9.
- TEN – Ryan Succop 48-yard field goal, 9:43. Colts 19–12. **Drive: 8 plays, 45 yards, 4:07.**
- TEN – Ryan Succop 23-yard field goal, 4:35. Colts 19–15. **Drive: 5 plays, 26 yards, 2:03.**

**Fourth quarter**

- TEN – DeMarco Murray 3-yard run (Ryan Succop kick), 10:01. Titans 22–19. **Drive: 15 plays, 87 yards, 8:24.**
- IND – Adam Vinatieri 52-yard field goal, 7:27. Tied 22–22. **Drive: 6 plays, 6 yards, 2:34.**
- TEN – Taywan Taylor 53-yard pass from Marcus Mariota (Ryan Succop kick), 5:29. Titans 29–22. **Drive: 4 plays, 75 yards, 1:58.**
- TEN – Derrick Henry 72-yard run (Ryan Succop kick), 0:47. Titans 36–22. **Drive: 5 plays, 87 yards, 1:32.**

**Top passers**

- IND – Jacoby Brissett – 21/37, 212 yards, 1 TD
- TEN – Marcus Mariota – 23/32, 306 yards, 1 TD, 1 INT

**Top rushers**

- IND – Frank Gore – 10 rushes, 49 yards
- TEN – Derrick Henry – 19 rushes, 131 yards, 1 TD

**Top receivers**

- IND – Jack Doyle – 7 receptions, 50 yards, 1 TD
- TEN – Eric Decker – 7 receptions, 88 yards

**Top tacklers**

- IND – John Simon – 6 tackles, 5 assists, 1 sack
- TEN – Wesley Woodyard – 6 tackles, 2 assists

Despite leading 19–9 in the third quarter, the Colts were outscored 27–3 the rest of the way, resulting in their first loss to the Titans since 2011, snapping their 11-game winning streak in the series. The Colts fell to 2–4.

==== Week 7: vs. Jacksonville Jaguars ====
Week Seven: Jacksonville Jaguars at Indianapolis Colts – Game summary

Quarter	1	2	3	4	Total
**Jaguars**	14	6	7	0	**27**
Colts	0	0	0	0	**0**

at Lucas Oil Stadium, Indianapolis, Indiana

- Date: October 22
- Game time: 1:00 p.m. EDT
- Game weather: Played indoors (retractable roof closed)
- Game attendance: 63,104
- Referee: Jeff Triplette
- TV announcers (CBS): Tom McCarthy, Steve Beuerlein and Steve Tasker
- Recap, Gamebook

Game information

**First quarter**

- JAX – Chris Ivory 1-yard run (Josh Lambo kick), 9:30. Jaguars 7–0. **Drive: 12 plays, 75 yards, 5:30.**
- JAX – Marcedes Lewis 5-yard pass from Blake Bortles (Josh Lambo kick), 5:01. Jaguars 14–0. **Drive: 4 plays, 70 yards, 1:54.**

**Second quarter**

- JAX – Josh Lambo 42-yard field goal, 7:38. Jaguars 17–0. **Drive: 12 plays, 67 yards, 6:35.**
- JAX – Josh Lambo 33-yard field goal, 1:56. Jaguars 20–0. **Drive: 8 plays, 66 yards, 3:51.**

**Third quarter**

- JAX – T. J. Yeldon 58-yard run (Josh Lambo kick), 5:58. Jaguars 27–0. **Drive: 6 plays, 91 yards, 2:42.**

**Fourth quarter**

- No scoring plays

**Top passers**

- JAX – Blake Bortles – 18/26, 330 yards, TD
- IND – Jacoby Brissett – 22/37, 200 yards

**Top rushers**

- JAX – T. J. Yeldon – 9 carries, 122 yards, TD
- IND – Frank Gore – 9 carries, 34 yards

**Top receivers**

- JAX – Allen Hurns – 5 receptions, 101 yards
- IND – Jack Doyle – 6 receptions, 44 yards

Jacksonville dominated the entire game, and beat the Colts in Indianapolis for the first time since 2012. The Colts fell to 2–5. The Colts were also shut out at home for the first time since 1993.

==== Week 8: at Cincinnati Bengals ====
Week Eight: Indianapolis Colts at Cincinnati Bengals – Game summary

Quarter	1	2	3	4	Total
Colts	0	13	7	3	**23**
**Bengals**	3	7	7	7	**24**

at Paul Brown Stadium, Cincinnati, Ohio

- Date: October 29
- Game time: 1:00 p.m. EDT
- Game weather: 39 °F (4 °C), cloudy
- Game attendance: 57,901
- Referee: Jerome Boger
- TV announcers (CBS): Spero Dedes and Adam Archuleta
- Recap, Gamebook

Game information

**First quarter**

- CIN – Randy Bullock 29-yard field goal, 5:41. Bengals 3–0. **Drive: 9 plays, 38 yards, 3:59.**

**Second quarter**

- IND – Adam Vinatieri 29-yard field goal, 12:02. Tied 3–3. **Drive: 7 plays, 16 yards, 2:40.**
- IND – Jack Doyle 13-yard pass from Jacoby Brissett (Adam Vinatieri kick), 8:14. Colts 10–3. **Drive: 7 plays, 48 yards, 3:23.**
- CIN – A. J. Green 8-yard pass from Andy Dalton (Randy Bullock kick), 4:36. Tied 10–10. **Drive: 7 plays, 91 yards, 3:38.**
- IND – Adam Vinatieri 33-yard field goal, 0:00. Colts 13–10. **Drive: 7 plays, 65 yards, 1:13.**

**Third quarter**

- CIN – Josh Malone 25-yard pass from Andy Dalton (Randy Bullock kick), 9:10. Bengals 17–13. **Drive: 11 plays, 77 yards, 5:50.**
- IND – Marlon Mack 24-yard pass from Jacoby Brissett (Adam Vinatieri kick), 2:10. Colts 20–17. **Drive: 13 plays, 88 yards, 7:00.**

**Fourth quarter**

- IND – Adam Vinatieri 29-yard field goal, 11:21. Colts 23–17. **Drive: 9 plays, 26 yards, 4:39.**
- CIN – Carlos Dunlap 16-yard interception return (Randy Bullock kick), 6:58. Bengals 24–23.

**Top passers**

- IND – Jacoby Brissett – 25/39, 233 yards, 2 TD, INT
- CIN – Andy Dalton – 17/29, 243 yards, 2 TD

**Top rushers**

- IND – Frank Gore – 16 carries, 82 yards
- CIN – Joe Mixon – 11 carries, 18 yards

**Top receivers**

- IND – Jack Doyle – 12 receptions, 121 yards, TD
- CIN – Tyler Kroft – 5 receptions, 46 yards

**Top tacklers**

- IND – Jon Bostic – 4 Tackles, 4 assists, 1 sack and Antonio Morrison – 3 Tackles, 5 assists
- CIN – Darqueze Dennard – 7 Tackles, 3 Assists

Despite leading for a good portion of the game, a late pick 6 by Jacoby Brissett did the Colts in, as they fell to 2–6.

==== Week 9: at Houston Texans ====
Week Nine: Indianapolis Colts at Houston Texans – Game summary

Quarter	1	2	3	4	Total
**Colts**	7	3	7	3	**20**
Texans	0	7	0	7	**14**

at NRG Stadium, Houston, Texas

- Date: November 5
- Game time: 1:00 p.m. EST/12:00 p.m. CST
- Game weather: Played indoors (retractable roof closed)
- Game attendance: 71,709
- Referee: John Parry
- TV announcers (CBS): Greg Gumbel, Trent Green and Jamie Erdahl
- Recap, Gamebook

Game information

**First quarter**

- IND – T. Y. Hilton 45-yard pass from Jacoby Brissett (Adam Vinatieri kick), 8:33. Colts 7–0. **Drive: 7 plays, 92 yards, 4:00.**

**Second quarter**

- IND – Adam Vinatieri 22-yard field goal, 4:37. Colts 10–0. **Drive: 10 plays, 51 yards, 4:53.**
- HOU – Lamarr Houston 34-yard fumble recovery (Kaʻimi Fairbairn kick), 0:56. Colts 10–7. **Drive: 7 plays, 14 yards, 0:56.**

**Third quarter**

- IND – T. Y. Hilton 80-yard pass from Jacoby Brissett (Adam Vinatieri kick), 1:56. Colts 17–7. **Drive: 6 plays, 91 yards, 3:45.**

**Fourth quarter**

- IND – Adam Vinatieri 53-yard field goal, 9:17. Colts 20–7. **Drive: 7 plays, 60 yards, 3:46.**
- HOU – DeAndre Hopkins 34-yard pass from Tom Savage (Kaʻimi Fairbairn kick), 6:11. Colts 20–14. **Drive: 6 plays, 75 yards, 3:01.**

**Top passers**

- IND – Jacoby Brissett – 20/30, 308 yards, 2 TD
- HOU – Tom Savage – 19/44, 219 yards, TD

**Top rushers**

- IND – Frank Gore – 17 carries, 51 yards
- HOU – Lamar Miller – 10 carries, 57 yards

**Top receivers**

- IND – T. Y. Hilton – 5 receptions, 175 yards, 2 TD
- HOU – DeAndre Hopkins – 6 receptions, 86 yards, TD

Against the equally disappointing Texans, the Colts improved to 3–6 and snapped their 3-game losing streak to the Texans.

==== Week 10: vs. Pittsburgh Steelers ====
Week Ten: Pittsburgh Steelers at Indianapolis Colts – Game summary

Quarter	1	2	3	4	Total
**Steelers**	0	3	6	11	**20**
Colts	0	10	7	0	**17**

at Lucas Oil Stadium, Indianapolis, Indiana

- Date: November 12
- Game time: 1:00 p.m. EST
- Game weather: Played indoor (retractable roof closed)
- Game attendance: 66,146
- Referee: Clete Blakeman
- TV announcers (CBS): Greg Gumbel, Trent Green and Jamie Erdahl
- Recap, Gamebook

Game information

**First quarter**

- No scoring plays.

**Second quarter**

- IND – Donte Moncrief 60-yard pass from Jacoby Brissett (Adam Vinatieri kick), 14:52. Colts 7–0. **Drive: 4 plays, 68 yards, 1:21.**
- IND – Adam Vinatieri 48-yard field goal, 5:51. Colts 10–0. **Drive: 13 plays, 63 yards, 7:13.**

**Third quarter**

- PIT – Chris Boswell 41-yard field goal, 0:30. Colts 10–3. **Drive: 8 plays, 39 yards, 1:09.**
- IND – Chester Rogers 61-yard pass from Jacoby Brissett (Adam Vinatieri kick), 12:46. Colts 17–3. **Drive: 4 plays, 75 yards, 2:14.**
- PIT – JuJu Smith-Schuster 7-yard pass from Ben Roethlisberger (kick blocked), 7:47. Colts 17–9. **Drive: 8 plays, 78 yards, 4:59.**

**Fourth quarter**

- PIT – Vance McDonald 7-yard pass from Ben Roethlisberger (Ben Roethlisberger-Martavis Bryant pass), 11:52. Tied 17–17. **Drive: 3 plays, 10 yards, 1:00.**
- PIT – Chris Boswell 33-yard field goal, 0:00. Steelers 20–17. **Drive: 10 plays, 70 yards, 3:10.**

**Top passers**

- PIT – Ben Roethlisberger – 19/31, 236 yards, 2 TD, INT
- IND – Jacoby Brissett – 14/24, 222 yards, 2 TD, INT

**Top rushers**

- PIT – Le'Veon Bell – 26 carries, 80 yards
- IND – Frank Gore – 17 carries, 54 yards

**Top receivers**

- PIT – JuJu Smith-Schuster – 5 receptions, 97 yards, TD
- IND – Chester Rogers – 6 receptions, 104 yards, TD

**Top tacklers**

- PIT – Sean Davis – 6 tackles, 1 assist
- IND – Antonio Morrison – 5 tackles, 4 assists

Despite leading 17–3 in the 3rd quarter, the Colts lost to the Steelers 20–17 to fall to 3–7, their 5th straight loss to Pittsburgh.

==== Week 12: vs. Tennessee Titans ====
Week Twelve: Tennessee Titans at Indianapolis Colts – Game summary

Quarter	1	2	3	4	Total
**Titans**	6	0	7	7	**20**
Colts	0	13	3	0	**16**

at Lucas Oil Stadium, Indianapolis, Indiana

- Date: November 26
- Game time: 1:00 p.m. EST
- Game weather: 37 °F (3 °C), cloudy and frigid — retractable roof open
- Game attendance: 62,207
- Referee: Craig Wrolstad
- TV announcers (Fox): Chris Myers, Daryl Johnston and Laura Okmin
- Recap, Gamebook

Game information

**First quarter**

- TEN – Ryan Succop 29-yard field goal, 7:54. Titans 3–0. **Drive: 11 plays, 53 yards, 6:09.**
- TEN – Ryan Succop 45-yard field goal, 1:52. Titans 6–0. **Drive: 5 plays, 37 yards, 3:23.**

**Second quarter**

- IND – Adam Vinatieri 26-yard field goal, 10:05. Titans 6–3. **Drive: 14 plays, 67 yards, 6:47.**
- IND – Adam Vinatieri 28-yard field goal, 2:07. Tied 6–6. **Drive: 11 plays, 45 yards, 6:25.**
- IND – Frank Gore 14-yard run (Adam Vinatieri kick), 0:38. Colts 13–6. **Drive: 6 plays, 34 yards, 1:16.**

**Third quarter**

- IND – Adam Vinatieri 42-yard field goal, 6:05. Colts 16–6. **Drive: 13 plays, 55 yards, 6:57.**
- TEN – Delanie Walker 2-yard pass from Marcus Mariota (Ryan Succop kick), 1:50. Colts 16–13. **Drive: 1 plays, 4 yards, 0:25.**

**Fourth quarter**

- TEN – DeMarco Murray 1-yard run (Ryan Succop kick), 5:59. Titans 20–16. **Drive: 9 plays, 77 yards, 5:25.**

**Top passers**

- TEN – Marcus Mariota – 17/25, 184 yards, TD, 2 INT
- IND – Jacoby Brissett – 17/29, 196 yards

**Top rushers**

- TEN – Derrick Henry – 13 carries, 79 yards
- IND – Frank Gore – 17 carries, 62 yards, TD

**Top receivers**

- TEN – Delonie Walker – 4 receptions, 63 yards, TD
- IND – Jack Doyle – 7 receptions, 94 yards

**Top tacklers**

- TEN – Avery Williamson – 2 Tackles, 7 Assists, 1 sack
- IND – Jon Bostic – 5 Tackles, 5 Assists

Despite a 16–6 lead in the 3rd quarter, the Titans managed to pull off the comeback to win 20–16 and send the Colts to 3–8. It was the first time since 2002 that the Colts had been swept by the Titans.

==== Week 13: at Jacksonville Jaguars ====
Week Thirteen: Indianapolis Colts at Jacksonville Jaguars – Game summary

Quarter	1	2	3	4	Total
Colts	0	3	7	0	**10**
**Jaguars**	7	9	11	3	**30**

at EverBank Field, Jacksonville, Florida

- Date: December 3
- Game time: 1:00 p.m. EST
- Game weather: 70 °F (21 °C), partly cloudy
- Game attendance: 61,207
- Referee: Bill Vinovich
- TV announcers (CBS): Kevin Harlan, Rich Gannon and Melanie Collins
- Recap, Gamebook

Game information

**First quarter**

- JAX – Marqise Lee 4-yard pass from Blake Bortles (Josh Lambo kick), 6:23. Jaguars 7–0. **Drive: 11 plays, 80 yards, 5:18.**

**Second quarter**

- JAX – Josh Lambo 30-yard field goal, 12:46. Jaguars 10–0. **Drive: 11 plays, 57 yards, 5:14.**
- IND – Adam Vinatieri 27-yard field goal, 7:05. Jaguars 10–3. **Drive: 10 plays, 69 yards, 5:41.**
- JAX – Keelan Cole 8-yard pass from Blake Bortles (kick aborted, pass failed), 2:00. Jaguars 16–3. **Drive: 12 plays, 75 yards, 5:07.**

**Third quarter**

- JAX – Leonard Fournette 5-yard run (Blake Bortles to Marcedes Lewis, pass succeeded), 10:38. Jaguars 24–3. **Drive: 8 plays, 67 yards, 4:26.**
- IND – T. Y. Hilton 40-yard pass from Jacoby Brissett (Adam Vinatieri kick), 6:49. Jaguars 24–10. **Drive: 9 plays, 75 yards, 2:54.**
- JAX – Josh Lambo 23-yard field goal, 0:37. Jaguars 27–10. **Drive: 11 plays, 81 yards, 6:06.**

**Fourth quarter**

- JAX – Josh Lambo 39-yard field goal, 2:58. Jaguars 30–10. **Drive: 6 plays, 31 yards, 3:10.**

**Top passers**

- IND – Jacoby Brissett – 21/36, 174 yards, TD, 2 INT
- JAX – Blake Bortles – 26/35, 309 yards, 2 TD

**Top rushers**

- IND – Frank Gore – 13 carries, 61 yards
- JAX – Leonard Fournette – 20 carries, 57 yards, TD

**Top receivers**

- IND – T. Y. Hilton – 3 receptions, 51 yards, TD
- JAX – Marqise Lee – 7 receptions, 86 yards, TD

**Top tacklers**

- IND – Matthias Farley – 5 tackles, 2 assists
- JAX – Paul Posluszny – 10 tackles, 4 assists, 1.5 sacks

For the second time this season, the Jaguars managed to dominate Indianapolis, winning this game 30–10 and sending the Colts to 3–9, their 3rd straight road loss to the Jaguars.

==== Week 14: at Buffalo Bills ====
Week Fourteen: Indianapolis Colts at Buffalo Bills – Game summary

Quarter	1	2	3	4	OT	Total
Colts	0	0	0	7	0	**7**
**Bills**	0	7	0	0	6	**13**

at New Era Field, Orchard Park, New York

- Date: December 10
- Game time: 1:00 p.m. EST
- Game weather: 32 °F (0 °C), heavy lake effect snow
- Game attendance: 60,222
- Referee: Brad Allen
- TV announcers (CBS): Spero Dedes, Adam Archuleta and Steve Tasker
- Recap, Gamebook

Game information

**First quarter**

- No scoring plays

**Second quarter**

- BUF – Kelvin Benjamin 8-yard pass from Nathan Peterman (Stephen Hauschka kick), 0:27. Bills 7–0. **Drive: 7 plays, 80 yards, 1:15.**

**Third quarter**

- No scoring plays

**Fourth quarter**

- IND – Jack Doyle 3-yard pass from Jacoby Brissett (Adam Vinatieri kick), 1:16. Tied 7–7. **Drive: 19 plays, 77 yards, 9:53.**

**Overtime**

- BUF – LeSean McCoy 21-yard run, 1:33. Bills 13–7. **Drive: 6 plays, 65 yards, 0:52.**

**Top passers**

- IND – Jacoby Brissett – 11/22, 69 yards, 1 TD
- BUF – Nathan Peterman – 5/10, 57 yards, 1 TD

**Top rushers**

- IND – Frank Gore – 36 rushes, 130 yards
- BUF – LeSean McCoy – 32 rushes, 156 yards, 1 TD

**Top receivers**

- IND – Marlon Mack – 2 receptions, 21 yards
- BUF – Kelvin Benjamin – 3 receptions, 38 yards, 1 TD

**Top tacklers**

- IND – Matthias Farley – 7 tackles, 1 assists, 1 INT
- BUF – Matt Milano – 10 tackles, 1 assist

The game in Buffalo, called the "Snow Bowl" by the media, was notable for being held in the midst of a lake-effect snow storm that left over a foot of snow on the stadium's turf in similar weather conditions to games such as the Snowplow Game. The Colts and Bills played a low-scoring affair, tied at 7 by the end of regulation thanks to a fourth quarter touchdown pass from Jacoby Brissett to Jack Doyle. However, LeSean McCoy managed to win the game for the Bills with a 21-yard touchdown run in overtime. The Colts fell to 3–10 and were officially eliminated from playoff contention.

==== Week 15: vs. Denver Broncos ====
Week Fifteen: Denver Broncos at Indianapolis Colts – Game summary

Quarter	1	2	3	4	Total
**Broncos**	0	7	15	3	**25**
Colts	7	3	3	0	**13**

at Lucas Oil Stadium, Indianapolis, Indiana

- Date: December 14
- Game time: 8:25 p.m. EST
- Game weather: Played indoors (retractable roof closed)
- Game attendance: 63,411
- Referee: Terry McAulay
- TV announcers (NBC/NFLN/Amazon Video): Mike Tirico, Cris Collinsworth and Heather Cox
- Recap, Gamebook

Game information

**First quarter**

- IND – Jacoby Brissett 7-yard run (Adam Vinatieri kick), 8:02. Colts 7–0. **Drive: 7 plays, 50 yards, 3:32.**

**Second quarter**

- IND – Adam Vinatieri 45-yard FG, 6:33. Colts 10–0. **Drive: 10 plays, 59 yards, 6:04.**
- DEN – Brock Osweiler 18-yard run (Brandon McManus kick), 1:19. Colts 10–7. **Drive: 11 plays, 75 yards, 5:14.**

**Third quarter**

- IND – Adam Vinatieri 39-yard FG, 9:13. Colts 13–7. **Drive: 12 plays, 54 yards, 5:47.**
- DEN – Cody Latimer 22-yard pass from Brock Osweiler (Brandon McManus kick), 4:16. Broncos 14–13. **Drive: 9 plays, 79 yards, 4:57.**
- DEN – Jeff Heuerman 54-yard pass from Brock Osweiler (Brock Osweiler–Cody Latimer pass), 2:37. Broncos 22–13. **Drive: 3 plays, 67 yards, 1:17.**

**Fourth quarter**

- DEN – Brandon McManus 40-yard FG, 5:13. Broncos 25–13. **Drive: 16 plays, 62 yards, 9:40.**

**Top passers**

- DEN – Brock Osweiler – 12/17, 194 yards, 2 TD, 1 rushing TD
- IND – Jacoby Brissett – 17/30, 158 yards, 1 rushing TD

**Top rushers**

- DEN – C. J. Anderson – 30 rushes, 158 yards
- IND – Frank Gore – 10 rushes, 31 yards

**Top receivers**

- DEN – Demaryius Thomas – 5 rushes, 69 yards
- IND – Jack Doyle – 7 receptions, 47 yards

The Colts lost at home to the Broncos, who were also on a downspiral season, to fall to 3–11. It was their first loss at home to the Broncos since 2003, ending their 6-game home winning streak against them.

==== Week 16: at Baltimore Ravens ====
Week Sixteen: Indianapolis Colts at Baltimore Ravens – Game summary

Quarter	1	2	3	4	Total
Colts	0	7	6	3	**16**
**Ravens**	3	10	3	7	**23**

at M&T Bank Stadium, Baltimore, Maryland

- Date: December 23
- Game time: 4:30 p.m. EST
- Game weather: 63 °F (17 °C), cloudy
- Game attendance: 70,590
- Referee: Tony Corrente
- TV announcers (NFLN): Greg Gumbel, Trent Green and Jamie Erdahl
- Recap, Gamebook

Game information

**First quarter**

- BAL – Justin Tucker 30 yard field goal, 6:38. Ravens 3–0. **Drive: 14 plays, 52 yards, 7:30.**

**Second quarter**

- BAL – Michael Campanaro 6 yard pass from Joe Flacco (Justin Tucker kick), 12:19. Ravens 10–0. **Drive: 10 plays, 71 yards, 3:54.**
- IND – Frank Gore 14 yard pass from Jacoby Brissett (Adam Vinatieri kick), 7:38. Ravens 10–7. **Drive: 9 plays, 75 yards, 4:38.**
- BAL – Justin Tucker 39 yard field goal, 2:00. Ravens 13–7. **Drive: 11 plays, 54 yards, 5:43.**

**Third quarter**

- BAL – Justin Tucker 36 yard field goal, 9:29. Ravens 16–7. **Drive: 11 plays, 57 yards, 5:36.**
- IND – Adam Vinatieri 48 yard field goal, 7:18. Ravens 16–10. **Drive: 7 plays, 30 yards, 2:11.**
- IND – Adam Vinatieri 38 yard field goal, 1:38. Ravens 16–13. **Drive: 7 plays, 47 yards, 4:27.**

**Fourth quarter**

- BAL – Maxx Williams 4 yard pass from Joe Flacco (Justin Tucker kick), 8:40. Ravens 23–13. **Drive: 14 plays, 75 yards, 7:54.**
- IND – Adam Vinatieri 30 yard field goal, 4:37. Ravens 23–16. **Drive: 13 plays, 64 yards, 4:07**

**Top passers**

- IND – Jacoby Brissett – 16/33, 215 yards, TD
- BAL – Joe Flacco – 29/38, 237 yards, 2 TD

**Top rushers**

- IND – Frank Gore – 17 rushes, 68 yards
- BAL – Alex Collins – 18 rushes, 51 yards

**Top receivers**

- IND – T. Y. Hilton – 6 receptions, 100 yards
- BAL – Mike Wallace – 4 receptions, 60 yards

**Top tacklers**

- IND – Anthony Walker Jr. – 6 tackles, 3 assists
- BAL – C. J. Mosley and Patrick Onwuasor – 6 tackles

The Colts played a close matchup with the playoff-bound Ravens, but it was not enough as the Colts lost and fell to 3–12.

==== Week 17: vs. Houston Texans ====
Week Seventeen: Houston Texans at Indianapolis Colts – Game summary

Quarter	1	2	3	4	Total
Texans	3	10	0	0	**13**
**Colts**	0	7	7	8	**22**

at Lucas Oil Stadium, Indianapolis, Indiana

- Date: December 31
- Game time: 1:00 p.m. EST
- Game weather: Played indoors (retractable roof closed)
- Game attendance: 60,557
- Referee: Gene Steratore
- TV announcers (CBS): Tom McCarthy, Steve Tasker and Steve Beuerlein
- Recap, Gamebook

Game information

**First quarter**

- HOU – Kaʻimi Fairbairn 52-yard field goal, 8:15. Texans 3–0. **Drive: 10 plays, 41 yards, 5:26.**

**Second quarter**

- IND – Jack Doyle 6-yard pass from Jacoby Brissett (Adam Vinatieri kick), 14:55. Colts 7–3. **Drive: 15 plays, 75 yards, 8:20.**
- HOU – Alfred Blue 2-yard run (Kaʻimi Fairbairn kick), 6:55. Texans 10–7. **Drive: 13 plays, 75 yards, 8:00.**
- HOU – Kaʻimi Fairbairn 46-yard field goal, 1:44. Texans 13–7. **Drive: 10 plays, 58 yards, 4:37.**

**Third quarter**

- IND – Marlon Mack 1-yard run (Adam Vinatieri kick), 6:51. Colts 14–13. **Drive: 13 plays, 83 yards, 6:39.**

**Fourth quarter**

- IND – T. J. Yates sacked in end zone by Hassan Ridgeway for a Safety, 12:07. Colts 16–13.
- IND – Adam Vinatieri 54-yard field goal, 8:47. Colts 19–13. **Drive: 7 plays, 20 yards, 3:20.**
- IND – Adam Vinatieri 22-yard field goal, 0:31. Colts 22–13. **Drive: 12 plays, 49 yards, 6:06.**

**Top passers**

- HOU – T. J. Yates – 14/24, 137 yards, INT
- IND – Jacoby Brissett – 15/25, 114 yards, TD

**Top rushers**

- HOU – Alfred Blue – 18 carries, 39 yards, TD
- IND – Frank Gore – 24 carries, 100 yards

**Top receivers**

- HOU – Alfred Blue – 4 receptions, 36 yards
- IND – Jack Doyle – 4 receptions, 38 yards, TD

**Top tacklers**

- HOU –
- IND –

In a battle for the basement, the Colts defeated the Texans 22–13 and swept the Texans for the first time since 2014. The win also secured the Colts third place in the division. Head coach Chuck Pagano was fired just hours after the win.

=== Standings ===
==== Division ====
AFC South
	W	L	T	PCT	DIV	CONF	PF	PA	STK
^{(3)} Jacksonville Jaguars	10	6	0	.625	4–2	9–3	417	268	L2
^{(5)} Tennessee Titans	9	7	0	.563	5–1	8–4	334	356	W1
Indianapolis Colts	4	12	0	.250	2–4	3–9	263	404	W1
Houston Texans	4	12	0	.250	1–5	3–9	338	436	L6

==== Conference ====
AFC
#	Team	Division	W	L	T	PCT	DIV	CONF	SOS	SOV	STK
**Division leaders**
1 (Note: New England claimed the No. 1 seed over Pittsburgh based on head-to-head victory.)	New England Patriots	East	13	3	0	.813	5–1	10–2	.484	.466	W3
2	Pittsburgh Steelers	North	13	3	0	.813	6–0	10–2	.453	.423	W2
3 (Note: Jacksonville claimed the No. 3 seed over Kansas City based on conference record.)	Jacksonville Jaguars	South	10	6	0	.625	4–2	9–3	.434	.394	L2
4	Kansas City Chiefs	West	10	6	0	.625	5–1	8–4	.477	.481	W4
**Wild Cards**
5 (Note: Tennessee finished ahead of Buffalo, Baltimore and Los Angeles Chargers based on conference record, claiming the No. 5 seed. Buffalo and Baltimore finished ahead of Los Angeles Chargers based on conference record. Buffalo claimed the No. 6 seed over Baltimore based on strength of victory.)	Tennessee Titans	South	9	7	0	.563	5–1	8–4	.434	.396	W1
6	Buffalo Bills	East	9	7	0	.563	3–3	7–5	.492	.396	W1
**Did not qualify for the postseason**
7	Baltimore Ravens	North	9	7	0	.563	3–3	7–5	.441	.299	L1
8	Los Angeles Chargers	West	9	7	0	.563	3–3	6–6	.457	.347	W2
9	Cincinnati Bengals	North	7	9	0	.438	3–3	6–6	.465	.321	W2
10 (Note: Oakland finished ahead of Miami based on head-to-head victory.)	Oakland Raiders	West	6	10	0	.375	2–4	5–7	.512	.396	L4
11	Miami Dolphins	East	6	10	0	.375	2–4	5–7	.543	.531	L3
12 (Note: Denver finished ahead of the New York Jets based on head-to-head victory.)	Denver Broncos	West	5	11	0	.313	2–4	4–8	.492	.413	L2
13	New York Jets	East	5	11	0	.313	2–4	5–7	.520	.438	L4
14 (Note: Indianapolis finished ahead of Houston based on head-to-head sweep.)	Indianapolis Colts	South	4	12	0	.250	2–4	3–9	.480	.219	W1
15	Houston Texans	South	4	12	0	.250	1–5	3–9	.516	.375	L6
16	Cleveland Browns	North	0	16	0	.000	0–6	0–12	.520	–	L16
**Tiebreakers** (Note: When breaking ties for three or more teams under the NFL's rules, they are first broken within divisions, then comparing only the highest ranked remaining team from each division.)
