= NFL Color Rush =

Promotion

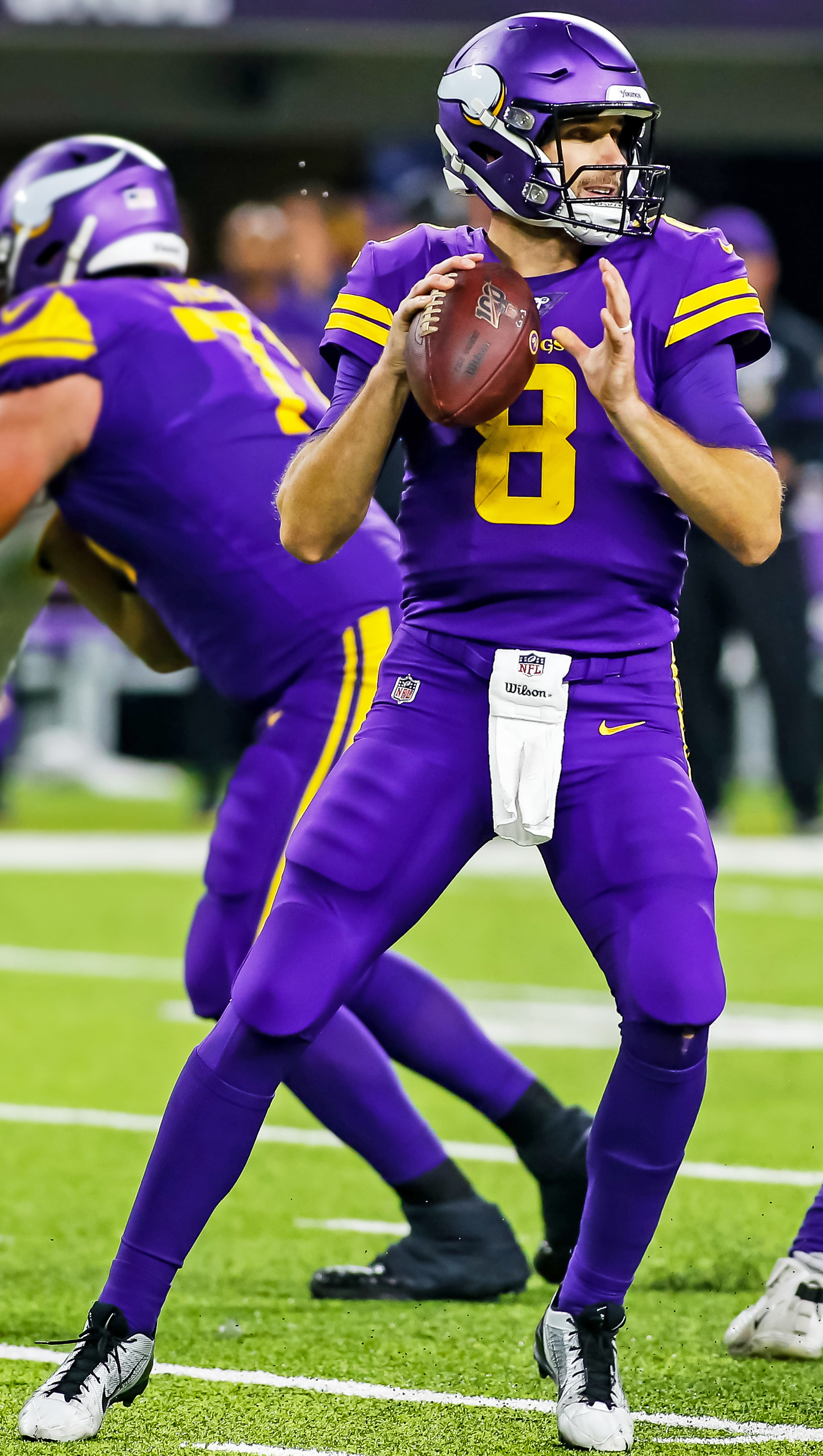
Minnesota Vikings quarterback Kirk Cousins wearing his team's Color Rush uniform in 2019

The NFL Color Rush was a promotion done in conjunction with the National Football League (NFL) and Nike that promotes so-called "color vs. color" matchups with teams in matchup-specific uniforms that are primarily one solid color with alternating colored accents, primarily airing on Thursday Night Football. Despite being promoted as color vs. color, some games had one team wearing traditional white uniforms, either by choice or out of necessity. The uniforms did not count against each team with regard to their allowed alternate uniform allotment. The games received mixed responses from fans, with some praising the NFL for changing up their games in terms of uniforms, while others criticized the promotion for some of its garish uniforms. The promotion was officially discontinued for the 2018 season, but many teams continue to wear the Color Rush uniforms and promote them heavily, notably the New England Patriots, Cleveland Browns, Seattle Seahawks, Dallas Cowboys, Pittsburgh Steelers, Buffalo Bills, and Los Angeles Chargers.

== History of color vs. color matchups ==
=== Early years ===
In the early days of the NFL through World War II, it was common to see teams wearing their team colored uniforms against each other. Many teams would almost always wear a primary colored jersey, only switching to a second jersey as a visitor when the home team's uniform color is similar. Following the arrival of the rival All-America Football Conference where each team had both a team colored jersey and a white jersey, NFL teams began adding a white jersey as a neutral color to avoid color clashes. Again, this was only used if teams such as the Chicago Bears and the Green Bay Packers (the latter before the arrival of Vince Lombardi) played each other and had similar jersey colors. NFL teams were not required to add a white jersey.

It would not be the AAFC (which partially merged into the NFL in 1950) that would change the status quo, but the mainstream adoption of television. Due to the technical limitations of TV, programming could only be broadcast in black and white, making it hard for fans to tell their teams apart. Out of necessity, starting with the 1957 NFL season, all teams were required to have both a team colored jersey and a white jersey, with the team colored jerseys being worn at home and white jerseys being worn at away games. This caused teams such as the Chicago Bears, Detroit Lions, Green Bay Packers, and Los Angeles Rams (none of which had a white jersey in 1956) to add a contrasting white jersey. In the Rams' case, it also forced the team to drop their gold jersey, as it was considered "too light" to wear against teams wearing white jerseys, replaced by blue jerseys. Other teams, such as the Cleveland Browns, that had worn white as their primary home uniform were also no longer allowed to wear those jerseys at home.

In 1964, the league allowed the home team to decide which jersey could be worn at home, which prompted many teams to wear their white jerseys at home so that fans could see the colors of the visiting team. With blackout policies not allowing the home games to be aired in home markets until 1973, this also meant that fans not attending games in person at times only saw the team's darker colored uniform on TV, which depending on the television they were watching may still be in black and white. Despite this rule change and the widespread adoption of color television by the end of the 1960s, the color/white rule generally remains in effect for the NFL even as college football relaxed its jersey rules in 2009.

=== Leaguewide promotions ===
The NFL began to allow exceptions as part of leaguewide promotions, beginning with the league's 75th Anniversary season in 1994. For the first time, the NFL allowed teams to wear throwback uniforms and in some cases allowed color vs. color as long as the colors did not clash with each other.

Color vs. color matchups would continue for a time in the early 2000s, mostly on Thanksgiving games. In 2002, the league allowed alternate uniforms with some jerseys being allowed to be worn against a colored jersey if it was light enough. Examples included gray jerseys worn by the New England Patriots in the 2000s and the Seattle Seahawks in the 2010s and early 2020s, as well as a one-off gold alternate by the New Orleans Saints that was worn against the Minnesota Vikings in 2002.

In 2009, the NFL celebrated what would have been the 50th season of the American Football League by allowing each of the original eight AFL teams to wear AFL-era throwback uniforms. One of those teams, the Kansas City Chiefs, was granted special permission by the NFL to allow the visiting Dallas Cowboys to wear their early 1960s throwbacks against the Chiefs (wearing throwbacks of their predecessors, the Dallas Texans) in "The Game that Never Was".

== Launching the Color Rush ==
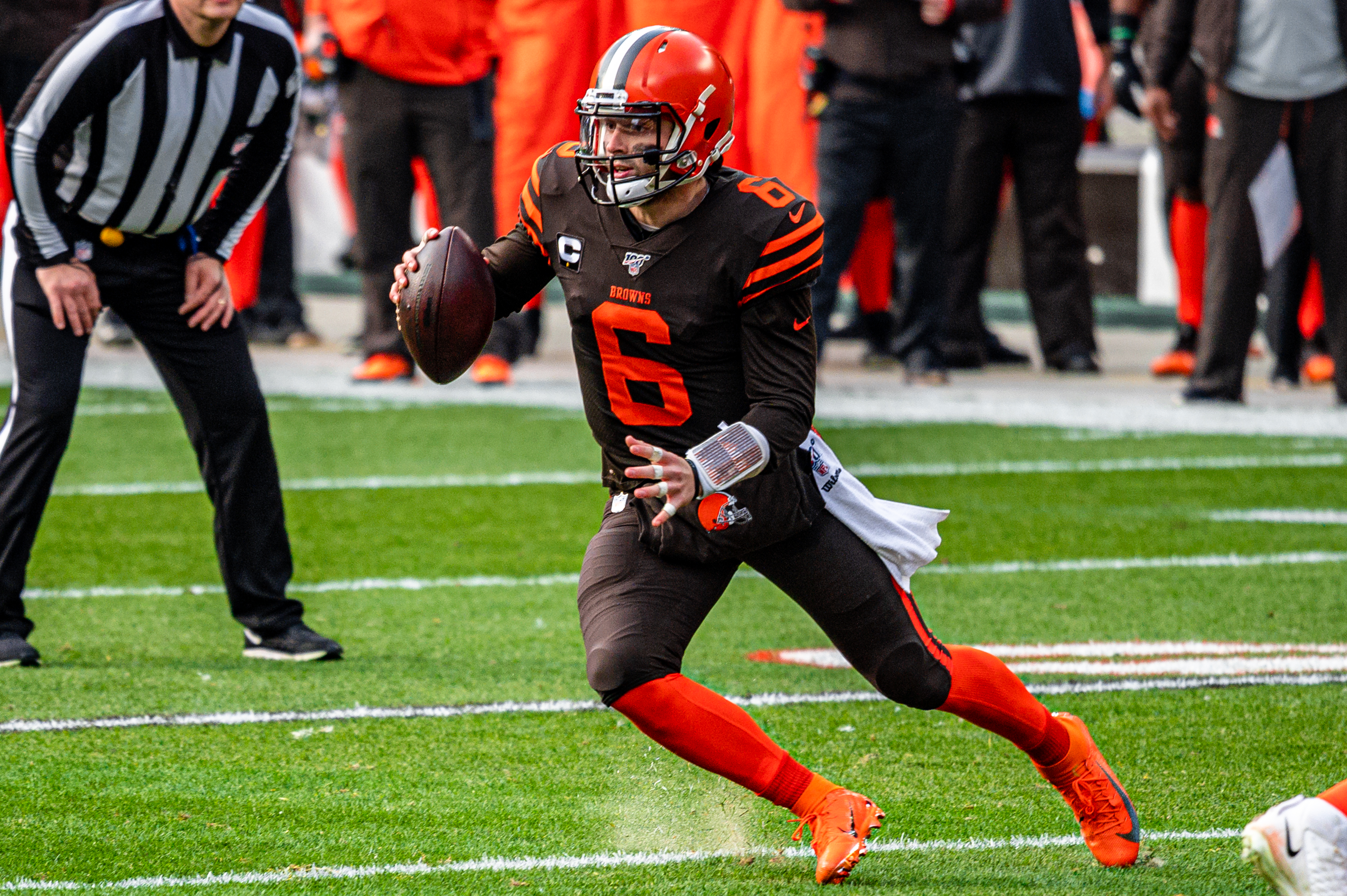
Cleveland Browns quarterback Baker Mayfield in the Color Rush uniform, which had become the team's permanent home jersey in 2019

=== Initial rollout ===
For 2012, Nike replaced Reebok as the league's exclusive uniform supplier. As Nike had been the longtime supplier of the Oregon Ducks football team and used the Ducks as the team to start the trend of college football teams radically changing their uniforms on a regular basis, some had speculated that the NFL was about to follow college football's path, or at the very least one team becoming the "Oregon of the NFL". The Seattle Seahawks, Minnesota Vikings, Cleveland Browns, Jacksonville Jaguars, Miami Dolphins, Tampa Bay Buccaneers, Detroit Lions, Tennessee Titans, New York Jets, Atlanta Falcons, Los Angeles Chargers, Los Angeles Rams, New England Patriots, Cincinnati Bengals, Washington Commanders, Arizona Cardinals, Denver Broncos, and Houston Texans are the teams that have completely redesigned their uniform since Nike took over. The Browns, Jaguars, Buccaneers, Lions, Jets, and Commanders have gone through multiple iterations of redesigned uniforms during this period, but none of them became the "Oregon of the NFL", with the Browns, Dolphins, Vikings, and Patriots opting for more traditional styles. This was further subdued in 2013 when the NFL banned alternate helmets out of fears of concussions. In June 2021, the NFL repealed that ruling, allowing teams to wear alternate helmets starting in 2022.

During the Packers' annual shareholder meeting in 2015, the team nonchalantly mentioned that color vs. color matchups would be allowed as an option during Thursday Night Football contests in 2015, while becoming mandatory in 2016. Initially, this belief thought teams would be allowed to wear their normal uniforms against each other or even their alternates. However, on October 30, 2015, the NFL announced the initial "Color Rush," a series of four Thursday contests in which all eight teams will wear specially designed alternate uniforms.

=== Trial run ===
The initial rollout featured the Carolina Panthers and Tennessee Titans wearing their regular alternate uniforms (with the Panthers debuting "Carolina blue" pants), while the Dallas Cowboys revived their white "Double Star" uniforms from the mid-1990s (while debuting white pants) and the then-St. Louis Rams wore a yellow version of their 1973–99 throwbacks for the games. The other four teams involved wore all-new uniforms for the games:

- The Buffalo Bills debuted all-red uniforms for the first time in team history, with red, white and blue shoulder stripes and blue-white-blue pants stripes. (In a minor inconsistency, the team's blue "charging buffalo" helmet logo was used, instead of the all-red "standing buffalo" the team uses on its throwback uniforms.)
- The Jacksonville Jaguars wore all-gold uniforms, after an accent color on their uniforms.
- The New York Jets, who wore Kelly green from 1963 to 1997, wore their current uniforms in the Kelly green color scheme, with their normally white sleeves also green and the middle shoulder stripe being the team's current shade of hunter green.
- The Tampa Bay Buccaneers wore an all-red ensemble.

=== Full rollout ===
In 2016, it was expected that all 32 teams would participate, with some teams eager to unveil their Color Rush uniforms. The Pittsburgh Steelers—one of the league's more conservative and tradition-bound teams with regard to uniforms—were the only team that did not participate in the 2015 Color Rush that revealed their Color Rush uniform style (but not revealing their uniform itself) before the leaguewide unveil, confirming that they would be wearing all-black uniforms with gold numbers on Christmas Day against the Baltimore Ravens. The team had planned on wearing a Color Rush uniform for its only Thursday Night match up against the Indianapolis Colts at Lucas Oil Stadium, but opted for the home game on Christmas against its hated rival and wore their standard road uniforms against the Colts. It was later announced that Thanksgiving games were exempt from the Color Rush promotion.

On September 13, 2016, the NFL and Nike unveiled the Color Rush uniforms for all 32 teams. The eight teams that participated in the Color Rush the year before continued their uniforms while the Steelers had already announced theirs. For 2016, the Jets, Browns, and Rams donned their regular white uniforms (see below), while the Cardinals, Falcons, and Texans will also wore their regular white uniforms as they were the away team and their opponents wore similar colored uniforms. The Lions, Colts, and Redskins did not wear their Color Rush uniforms for 2016 due to Thanksgiving games being exempt and none of the three teams having other Thursday night games. The 2017 season also featured at least one team, the Buffalo Bills, wearing their Color Rush uniform on a Sunday afternoon game (coincidentally this game, dubbed the Snow Bowl, occurred during a lake-effect snowstorm which made the Bills players more visible than their opponents, the all-white wearing Indianapolis Colts). The 2017 Pro Bowl also features the two conference all-star teams in solid red and blue colors respectively.

=== Discontinuation ===
On April 10, 2018, the league announced that Color Rush promotion would be discontinued under the terms of the new Thursday Night Football broadcast contract. Teams were allowed to continue to use their existing Color Rush uniforms as alternate jerseys. Some teams continued to wear their Color Rush uniforms during Thursday nights, and the Browns, who were the last team to have worn their Color Rush uniform debuted theirs on September 20, 2018. The Browns also debuted end zones painted with the stripe pattern found on their Color Rush jersey. Positive fan reception for the new uniforms was so strong that the Browns later switched the Color Rush design to be their primary home jersey, which it remained through 2019.

Other teams also later upgraded the Color Rush designs to be their primary home jersey, most notably the New England Patriots. After debuting in 2016, the all-navy Color Rush alternate became a successful fan favorite, as the Patriots went 6–1 in them. In 2020, the Patriots made the Color Rush alternate their primary home uniform, replacing the silver and blue design used during the Brady–Belichick era.

Although the program has discontinued, the Color Rush term is still used by some teams as a name for alternate uniform designs.

== Team by team ==
If Color Rush uniform is identical to an existing uniform, "First Use" in a Color Rush game is shown in italics.

Team	First Use	Last Use	Times Used	Color	Numbers	Detail	Notes
Arizona Cardinals	November 9, 2017	October 20, 2022	6	black	red, white outline	similar to existing black alternate with red panels on arms instead of white, different color numbers and black pants.	Black alternate helmet added in 2022, which is also worn with the black jersey/white pants combination. Replaced with a new all-black uniform in 2023.
Atlanta Falcons	December 7, 2017	December 7, 2017	1	red	black, white outline	throwback style numbers, no striping, modern logo on sleeves	Discontinued in 2020 following a team uniform overhaul.
Baltimore Ravens	November 10, 2016	November 27, 2025	6	purple	gold, white outline		A similar all-purple uniform was also worn January 2, 2022 against the Los Angeles Rams, but with less gold elements than its Color Rush counterpart. Added an alternate purple helmet in 2024.
Buffalo Bills	November 12, 2015	December 28, 2025	11	red	white, blue outline		First team to wear Color Rush on a Sunday. In 2024, the Bills wore the red Color Rush uniform with their typical white pants as a new alternate combination.
Carolina Panthers	November 26, 2015	October 12, 2017	3	blue	white, black outline	regular blue jersey with new matching pants, socks, and shoes	In 2024, the Panthers wore a variation of the all-blue Color Rush uniform with the alternate black helmet and black socks.
Chicago Bears	October 20, 2016	September 28, 2017	2	navy blue	white, orange outline	regular navy blue jersey with navy pants normally worn with the white jerseys; blue socks are worn with this set	
Cincinnati Bengals	September 29, 2016	November 20, 2022	9	white	solid black	black sleeves with shoulder tiger stripe pattern, black and white tiger stripes stripe on pants	A nod to the white tiger. The Bengals themselves unveiled their Color Rush uniforms at the Cincinnati Zoo and Botanical Garden. Its use was halted for the 2021 season and returned during the 2022 season, this time with white helmets. Retired in 2023 in favor of a variation with the primary white jersey replacing the Color Rush block-number jersey.
Cleveland Browns	September 20, 2018	November 15, 2026	10	brown	solid orange	with different shoulder stripes and pants stripes	Last team to wear Color Rush for the first time. Promoted to primary status for the 2019 season. Replaced with a similar set following their 2020 uniform change, the most noteworthy difference being the lack of sleeve stripes. A brown alternate helmet was added in 2025 to be worn with this uniform. The Browns did not wear this uniform in 2021, 2023 and 2024 in favor of their throwback white alternate uniform.
Dallas Cowboys	November 26, 2015	October 26, 2026	7	white	blue, blue and white outline	blue sleeves, stars on shoulders	White "Arctic Cowboy" alternate helmet, similar in design to the current silver helmet, was introduced in 2022 to be paired with this uniform.
Denver Broncos	October 13, 2016	November 20, 2022	6	orange	white, blue outline	throwback style, including helmet decal	Added a white alternate helmet in 2023, using the same throwback "D-horse" decal. Discontinued following a uniform change in 2024.
Detroit Lions	December 16, 2017	January 7, 2024	7	grey	white, Honolulu outline	The team had all black color rush uniforms it never wore. The grey uniforms were unveiled along with a whole new set of uniforms in 2017.	Added an alternate Honolulu blue helmet with the 1960s leaping tiger stripe logo to be worn with this uniform in 2023. Replaced by an all-black uniform with black-trimmed Honolulu blue helmet in 2024.
Green Bay Packers	October 20, 2016	December 14, 2025	5	white	solid green	essentially white pants with the regular white jersey; the team has continued to wear their Reebok-era design with few changes	Added a white alternate helmet in 2024, essentially the primary helmet without the gold elements. The white helmet was discontinued in 2026 to make room for a new helmet to be paired with the team's "Rivalries" uniform.
Houston Texans	September 14, 2017	November 19, 2023	8	navy blue	red, white outline		Texans also wear a second all-navy uniform, featuring both their primary navy uniform (with white numbers) and navy pants (with white stripes). They also previously wore an all-red uniform from 2007 to 2010. In 2023, the Texans wore their "Battle Red" alternate helmet with the Color Rush uniform. Replaced by a new red alternate in 2024 as part of a full uniform overhaul.
Indianapolis Colts	December 14, 2017	December 26, 2022	5	blue	solid white	essentially blue pants with the regular blue jersey	Replaced by a black-accented "Indiana Nights" alternate all-blue uniform with black helmet in 2023.
Jacksonville Jaguars	November 19, 2015	October 27, 2016	2	gold	white, teal outline		Discontinued following a team uniform change in 2018.
Kansas City Chiefs	December 8, 2016	October 12, 2023	2	red	white, yellow outline	Regular red jersey with red pants	Adapted as Chiefs recurring home alternate First worn September 15, 2013
Las Vegas Raiders	December 8, 2016	October 11, 2026	2	white	silver, black outline		Jersey is a throwback from the early 1970s and has been retained as such to be worn with their typical silver pants.
Los Angeles Chargers	October 13, 2016	December 15, 2019	4	royal blue	gold, white outline	Similar to Air Coryell-era uniforms but in the then-current design template.	The original design was replaced during the 2020 uniform update with a similar design in the new template with a second "Midnight Lightning" set in navy blue
Los Angeles Rams	December 17, 2015	November 25, 2019	5	yellow	solid blue	Identical style of throwback jersey, except yellow with dark blue detailing and numbers. For the 2016 game in which the team wore all-white, the team wore white ram's horns (as opposed to metallic gold) on their helmets, which were adopted for the team's standard uniform in 2017.	Discontinued following a team uniform overhaul in 2020.
Miami Dolphins	September 29, 2016	September 29, 2016	1	orange	white, aqua blue outline	white stripe on pants outlined in teal and marine blue in style of current uniforms	Worn for only one game and was eventually replaced by a white throwback jersey based on the 1972 "perfect season" uniforms.
Minnesota Vikings	December 1, 2016	November 24, 2022	5	purple	solid gold	with gold stripes and numbers	Vikings also wear a similar all-purple uniform but with white elements for select games. Replaced by all-white "Winter Warrior" uniform with white helmets in 2024.
New England Patriots	September 22, 2016	December 8, 2019	7	blue	white, red outline	with red-white-red Pat Patriot-era shoulder striping, and red-white-red stripes on pants	The first team to wear their Color Rush Uniforms during a Sunday Night Football contest. An adaptation of the Color Rush uniform with minor tweaks became the primary uniforms beginning in 2020.
New Orleans Saints	November 17, 2016	October 18, 2026	11	white	gold	throwback uniform, circa 1975 with gold numbers instead of black and no colored collar	Black alternate helmet was added in 2022 to be paired with this uniform, later replaced by a white alternate helmet in 2025.
New York Giants	December 22, 2016	November 12, 2026	7	white	blue, red outline	essentially the 1980s and 1990s white uniform with "GIANTS" script on helmets, but the "NY" logo on the collar	A throwback blue uniform set from the same era was unveiled in 2022, but with an alternate navy blue helmet and no alterations from the original look. In 2023, the alternate navy blue helmet was worn with the Color Rush uniform, though the team still wore all-white hosiery instead of blue. Retired temporarily in 2024 in favor of "Century Red" faux-back alternate to commemorate the franchise's 100th anniversary.
New York Jets	November 12, 2015	October 21, 2018	2	Kelly green	solid white	Kelly green helmet, jersey, and pants, with white and hunter green shoulder stripes	Discontinued when the Jets changed their uniforms to a design based on the Color Rush and 1990s-era uniforms. This set includes an all-black alternate ensemble similar to Color Rush uniforms, although it debuted after the end of the official Color Rush program.
Philadelphia Eagles	December 22, 2016	November 28, 2025	7	black	white, midnight green drop shadow		Exactly the same as all-black alternate worn since 2003. Worn with a black alternate helmet since 2022, though in 2023 they wore midnight green helmets to account for the use of their Kelly green throwback uniforms that year, as the NFL did not require a second alternate helmet until 2024.
Pittsburgh Steelers	December 25, 2016	December 15, 2025	8	black	solid gold	Throwback block numbers, similar to 1946–1965 uniform, but with modern stripes all in gold	
San Francisco 49ers	October 6, 2016	September 21, 2017	2	black	solid red	Based on the black alternates from the 2015 season	Replaced in 2018 by throwback uniforms from the 1994 Super Bowl champion 49ers team, with the 1994 team themselves having worn this uniform in tribute to the 1955 team. They are all-white with red numbers with a black drop shadow. A similar design became the basis of the 49ers' "Rivalries" set in 2025.
Seattle Seahawks	December 15, 2016	December 15, 2024	10	green	blue with white border	Worn with blue helmets	Based on an action green jersey worn over blue pants in 2009. The team has also worn the action green jerseys with blue pants.
Tampa Bay Buccaneers	December 17, 2015	December 8, 2019	7	red	pewter, white outline		Discontinued following a team uniform change in 2020 and replaced with an all-pewter set.
Tennessee Titans	November 19, 2015	November 16, 2017	3	light blue	white, dark blue outline	Standard alternate blue jersey with matching pants	Combination previously worn with navy socks between 2006 and 2013. Discontinued following a team uniform change in 2018.
Washington Commanders	—N/a	—N/a	0	yellow-gold	burgundy, white outline		Although Washington were originally designed gold uniforms, the team cited it as "garish" and opted for an all-burgundy combination. This ended the league-wide Color Rush program and the weekly color vs. color matchups. Shortly afterwards the NFL would announce the discontinuation of Color Rush.

== Style ==
=== Jerseys and pants ===
Uniforms are primarily one color, although the uniforms include different color accents for the jersey numbers and uniform details. Many uniforms duplicate the stripes and shoulder details of the team's current uniforms, but many do not. The Green Bay Packers' Color Rush Uniforms have the same stripe patterns on the sleeves as their regular uniforms, for instance. Conversely, the New England Patriots Color Rush uniforms mimic the stripes of their uniforms of a previous era. Whereas NFL teams most commonly wear pants in a contrasting color, all the Color Rush uniforms have pants and jerseys of the same color.

=== Shoes and socks ===
Color Rush uniforms also have matching colored shoes (instead of black or white) and matching socks. Some teams have continued to use their jersey and pants combination post-Color Rush without the matching shoes or socks.

=== Helmets ===
Most teams helmets do not change for the Color Rush games. The Denver Broncos, the New York Giants, and the Los Angeles Rams wore helmets with versions of older logos affixed in 2016, while the New York Jets wore helmets with the same logo, but in a green chrome finish, in 2015, with the Cardinals doing the same to their helmets in 2016. Since NFL rules dictate that players wear the same helmet throughout the season, only the decals can change, and the shells remain the same color. As a result, although the Broncos Color Rush helmets resemble the ones used through 1996, it is the same shade of blue as currently used.

In 2022, the NFL reinstated the use of alternate helmets, and some existing Color Rush designs received same-colored helmets.

=== Opposing team whites ===
If the Color Rush color is too similar to the home team, or if there are issues with visibility for color-blind viewers, the visiting team will wear their whites. It is unclear how each of these teams will modify elements of their uniform for the Color Rush games, if at all. At least one team, the Arizona Cardinals, was given a choice between wearing their traditional white-on-white uniforms or a specially designed all-white uniform from Nike. The Cardinals opted for their traditional whites, with white socks. In week two of 2016, the New York Jets wore white facemasks instead of green, white gloves, solid white socks instead of white with green stripes, and white shoes instead of their usual black in the spirit of the Color Rush program. In week three, the Houston Texans modified their uniforms by wearing solid white socks instead of their blue and white socks. In Week 15, the Rams wore their regular white uniform but switched the horns on the helmet from gold to white, marking the first time the team wore white horns on the helmet since the 1972 season; this was also done as a nod to the Fearsome Foursome. The following year in 2017, the Rams decided to make the white horns a part of their regular uniforms, leaving most of their uniform intact save for the pants with the hope to rebrand completely in the near future. In week 5 of 2017, the Patriots wore their regular away jerseys with white pants and socks on the road in Tampa Bay. This was the only time that combination was used, as they adopted a modified color rush uniform as their home set in 2020, with a white version of that jersey created for away games. Coincidentally, Tom Brady only played in Raymond James Stadium for that one game during his time with New England, before becoming a Buccaneer.

== Reception and controversy ==
=== Color blindness ===
Issues of colorblindness was first raised in November 2015. The first game between the Bills and Jets attracted most criticism, with the Bills' all-red uniforms and the Jets' Kelly green outfits being indistinguishable. The NFL issued a statement admitting their "standard television test did not account for color blindness for fans at home that became apparent last night".

In 2016, Nike brought in doctors from Mount Sinai Hospital to point out potential colorblindness issues. Aside from red-green, the NFL also avoided brown-purple (Browns/Ravens) and yellow-bright green (Rams/Seahawks) matchups, requiring one of those teams to wear white uniforms in those games. Many teams adjusted their colors.

=== Team participation ===
Some tradition-rich teams such as the Green Bay Packers and New York Giants chose to wear an all-white ensemble instead of wearing an all-team color ensemble, despite the Packers playing at home in their first Color Rush game and the team having a historical precedence with an all-green uniform in the early 1950s, which the team would ironically bring back as a throwback uniform in 2021. (The Packers wearing white in the Color Rush game also marked the first time the team wore white in a home game since a two-game experiment at Lambeau Field in 1989, and only the second time in the team's 97-year history.) Giants co-owner John Mara said that Nike initially approached the team about doing an all-red ensemble (which Mara rejected out of hand) and later an all-blue ensemble (which Mara initially approved, but got cold feet at the last minute) before going with the all-white look as a nod to the Bill Parcells era of the 1980s. Other teams that chose white as their Color Rush uniforms have either traditionally worn white (such as the Dallas Cowboys) or have already worn one-color ensembles as part of their regular uniforms on a regular basis, such as the New Orleans Saints and Cincinnati Bengals; in the latter's case, the team wore white uniforms as a nod to the white tiger.

The Packers and Giants non-participation contrasted with another tradition-rich team, the Pittsburgh Steelers, who fully embraced the Color Rush program and received a positive response from their fans over the all-black look. The Steelers made their Color Rush uniform their official alternate uniform for 2017 and continue to do so today. Other teams such as the Philadelphia Eagles, San Francisco 49ers, and Tennessee Titans went with their existing alternate uniforms for the Color Rush program, as opposed to creating a unique uniform for the games, while the Kansas City Chiefs simply matched their red jerseys up with their red pants—a look that the team had been sporting at times in recent seasons. The Chicago Bears simply wore their blue pants normally worn with their white jerseys with their blue jerseys, a look the team experimented with in the early 2000s.

In 2017, the Washington Redskins proposed a bylaw which would permit teams to opt out of Color Rush program participation. The Redskins later pulled the proposal before it went into a vote. However on the week of their Color Rush game, the Redskins announced they would not be wearing the gold color rush uniforms, which the team referred to as "garish" and instead wore all-burgundy jersey and pants.

Following the official discontinuation of the Color Rush program in 2018, some teams continued to wear their Color Rush uniforms and even branded them as such, following a rule change that allows teams to wear alternate uniforms up to three times per season and allowed two alternate uniforms. The Cleveland Browns, despite unveiling their Color Rush uniform in 2016, did not get the opportunity to wear theirs until the 2018 season, when it was met with great fanfare and subsequently worn two more times by the team that season. The Jacksonville Jaguars, Miami Dolphins, and San Francisco 49ers dropped their Color Rush uniforms altogether by 2018 (the Jaguars due to an unrelated uniform redesign, while the latter two replaced their Color Rush designs with standard throwback uniforms), while the Tennessee Titans (who like the Jaguars also redesigned their uniforms for 2018) actually branding their official third uniform as their Color Rush uniform despite being introduced after the discontinuation of the program. Some teams like the Dallas Cowboys and Baltimore Ravens also began to incorporate their Color Rush pants into their regular uniform attire while keeping their Color Rush sets.
