= Jacoby Brissett =

American football player (born 1992)

- Brissett in 2026

No. 11 – Baltimore Ravens
- Position: Quarterback
- Roster status: Active

Personal information
- Born: December 11, 1992 (age 33); West Palm Beach, Florida, U.S.
- Listed height: 6 ft 4 in (1.93 m)
- Listed weight: 235 lb (107 kg)

Career information
- High school: William T. Dwyer (Palm Beach Gardens, Florida)
- College: Florida (2011–2012); NC State (2013–2015)
- NFL draft: 2016: 3rd round, 91st overall pick

Career history
- New England Patriots (2016); Indianapolis Colts (2017–2020); Miami Dolphins (2021); Cleveland Browns (2022); Washington Commanders (2023); New England Patriots (2024); Arizona Cardinals (2025–2026); Baltimore Ravens (2026–present)

Awards and highlights
- Super Bowl champion (LI); NFL record: Completions in a regular season game: 47

Career NFL statistics as of Week 10, 2026
- Passing attempts: 2,600
- Passing completions: 1,617
- Completion percentage: 62.2%
- TD–INT: 86–40
- Passing yards: 16,825
- Passer rating: 85.5
- Rushing yards: 1,234
- Rushing touchdowns: 17
- Stats at Pro Football Reference

Jacoby JaJuan Brissett (born December 11, 1992) is an American professional football quarterback for the Baltimore Ravens of the National Football League (NFL). Following a stint with the Florida Gators, he played college football for the NC State Wolfpack. He was selected in the third round of the 2016 NFL draft by the New England Patriots and was a member of the team that won Super Bowl LI. Brissett was traded after his rookie season to the Indianapolis Colts, where he was their primary starter in 2017 and 2019. He spent his next four seasons alternating as the starter and backup with the Miami Dolphins, Cleveland Browns, Washington Commanders, and Patriots before joining the Arizona Cardinals in 2025. Midway through the 2026 season, Brissett was traded to the Ravens.

== Early life ==
Brissett was born on December 11, 1992, in West Palm Beach, Florida. (Note: Several profiles incorrectly list his year of birth as 1993.) He later attended William T. Dwyer High School in Palm Beach Gardens, Florida. Rivals.com ranked him as a four-star recruit and the third best dual-threat quarterback of his class. He committed to play college football at the University of Florida in February 2011.

== College career ==
As a true freshman with the Florida Gators in 2011, Brissett was a backup to starter John Brantley. In October, he started his first two career games, after Brantley was injured. His first career start came against number-one ranked LSU. He threw for 94 yards, one touchdown and two interceptions in the 41–11 loss. Overall, he appeared in eight games, completing 18-of-39 passes for 206 yards, two touchdowns, and four interceptions. Entering his sophomore season, Brissett competed with Jeff Driskel for the Gators starting job. On September 1, he started the opening game against the Bowling Green. However, Driskel was the starter for the rest of the season. Brissett started his second game of the season on November 17 against the Jacksonville State after Driskel was unable to play due to injury. Overall, he appeared in five games, completing 23-of-35 for 249 yards and a touchdown.

Brissett transferred to North Carolina State University in January 2013 to play for the Wolfpack. After sitting out the 2013 season due to transfer rules, Brissett took over as the Wolfpack's starting quarterback for 2014. That year, he passed for 2,606 yards with 23 touchdowns and five interceptions. As a senior in 2015, he passed for 2,662 yards and 20 touchdowns and six interceptions.

== Professional career ==
Pre-draft measurables
Height	Weight	Arm length	Hand span	Wingspan	40-yard dash	10-yard split	20-yard split	20-yard shuttle	Three-cone drill	Vertical jump	Broad jump	Wonderlic
6 ft 3 3/4 in (1.92 m)	231 lb (105 kg)	32 1/4 in (0.82 m)	9 3/4 in (0.25 m)	6 ft 7 3/8 in (2.02 m)	4.94 s	1.69 s	2.93 s	4.53 s	7.17 s	31 in (0.79 m)	9 ft 5 in (2.87 m)	24
All values from NFL Combine

=== New England Patriots (first stint) ===
Brissett was selected by the New England Patriots in the third round with the 91st overall pick in the 2016 NFL draft. He was the fifth quarterback to be selected that year. He was the only player selected in the 2016 draft who declined to hire an agent. On June 16, 2016, Brissett signed a four-year rookie contract with the Patriots, a contract he negotiated on his own.

Brissett played in his first regular season game on September 18, 2016, after starter Jimmy Garoppolo left the Patriots' Week 2 game against the Miami Dolphins after suffering a shoulder injury. The Patriots were leading 21–0 at the time, and Brissett finished the game completing 6-of-9 passes for 92 passing yards as the Patriots won 31–24. The next week, Brissett made his first career start against the Houston Texans, completing 11-of-19 passes for 103 yards and carrying the ball eight times for 48 yards including a 27-yard touchdown run in a 27–0 victory. He became the first African-American quarterback to start for the Patriots. Brissett injured his thumb in the game against the Texans, but started the following week in a 16–0 loss to the Buffalo Bills. Because the Patriots needed a roster spot for Tom Brady after Brady's Deflategate suspension had ended, Brissett was placed on injured reserve on October 7, 2016, after having thumb surgery. The Patriots activated Brissett from the injured reserve list; he began practicing on November 30, 2016, and was activated to the 53-man roster on December 21, 2016. He was inactive for all of the Patriots' remaining games, including Super Bowl LI, which the Patriots won 34–28 over the Atlanta Falcons.

=== Indianapolis Colts ===
==== 2017 season ====
Brissett (#7) attempts a pass through heavy snow in December 2017.

On September 2, 2017, Brissett was traded to the Indianapolis Colts for wide receiver Phillip Dorsett; the Colts had needed another quarterback after Andrew Luck suffered an injury. On September 10, 2017, Brissett made his debut with the Colts, relieving starting quarterback Scott Tolzien in the fourth quarter, and completed 2-of-3 passes for 51 yards as the Colts lost to the Los Angeles Rams 46–9. The following week, he earned his first start with the Colts and threw for 216 yards against the Arizona Cardinals. After a 13–13 tie in regulation, Brissett threw an interception to Tyrann Mathieu in the first play of overtime, leading to an Arizona Cardinals 16–13 victory.

On September 24, 2017, Brissett had two rushing touchdowns and completed 17-for-24 for 259 yards and a touchdown during a 31–28 victory over the Cleveland Browns. This marked his first victory and passing touchdown as a member of the Colts. During a Week 5 matchup against the San Francisco 49ers, Brissett completed 22-of-34 pass attempts for a career-high 314-yards and an interception, as the Colts won 26–23. In the victory, he also contributed a rushing touchdown. In Week 9, against the Houston Texans, he had 308 passing yards and two touchdowns in the 20–14 victory. After a six-game losing streak, Brissett had 114 passing yards and a touchdown in the regular season finale victory over the Texans. Overall in the 2017 season, Brissett had 3,098 passing yards, 13 passing touchdowns, seven interceptions, 260 rushing yards, and four rushing touchdowns. The Colts finished the 2017 season with a 4–12 record.

==== 2018 season ====
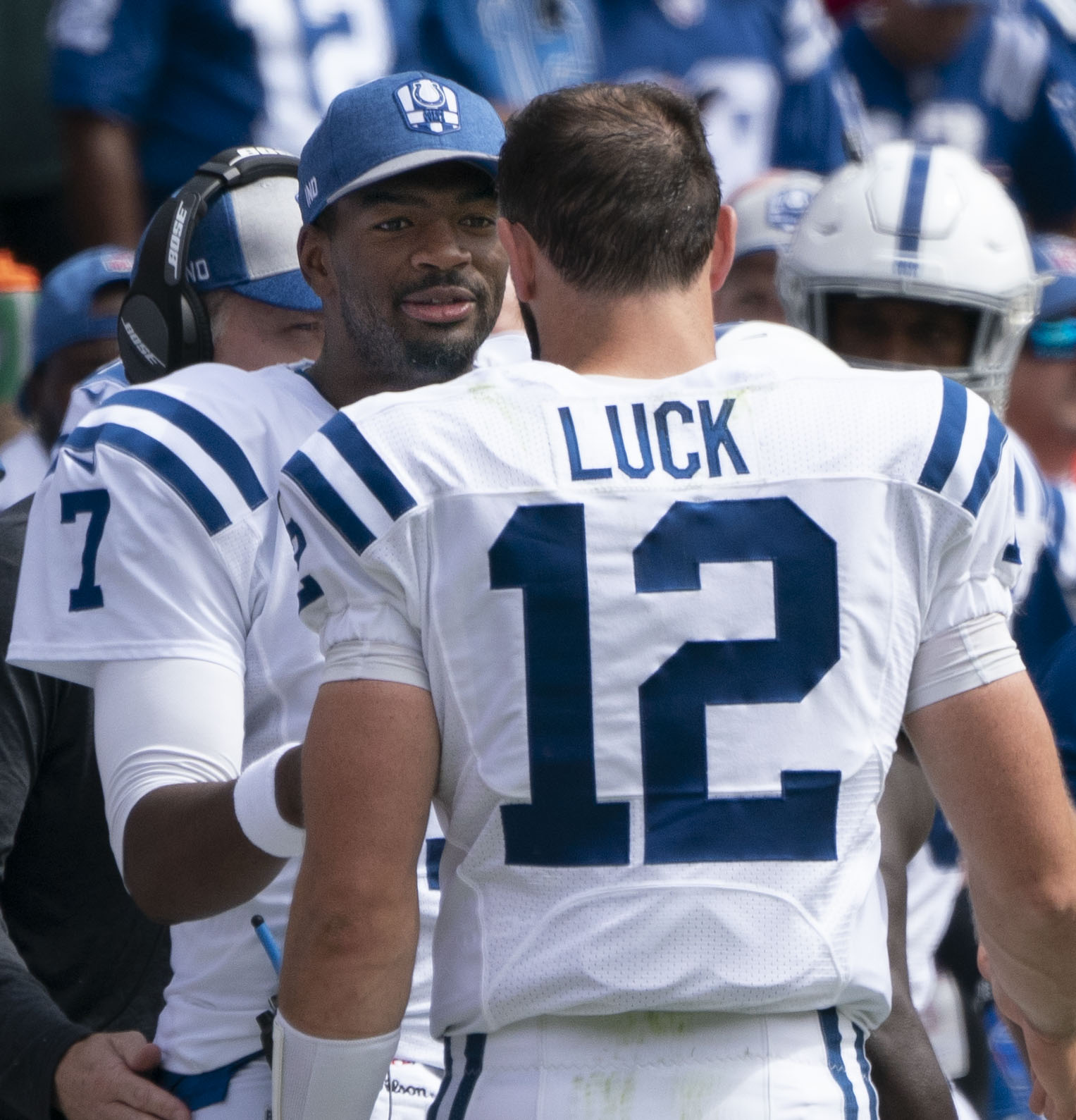
Brissett with the Indianapolis Colts in 2018

Brissett returned to the backup role in 2018 with Luck returning from his shoulder injury. In Week 3 against the Philadelphia Eagles, with the Colts down 20–16 with seconds left in the game, Brissett replaced Luck to attempt a Hail Mary pass from his own 46-yard line. He overthrew several players in the back of the end zone, and the Colts lost the game. The move was questioned by some journalists and fans and led to some speculation about the health of Luck's shoulder, although head coach Frank Reich and Luck both said it was purely because Brissett had a stronger throwing arm. In a Week 12 win over the Dolphins, Brissett was brought in and completed a 4th and short throw to Luck, who was lined up as a receiver. Overall, in the 2018 season, Brissett appeared in four games.

==== 2019 season ====
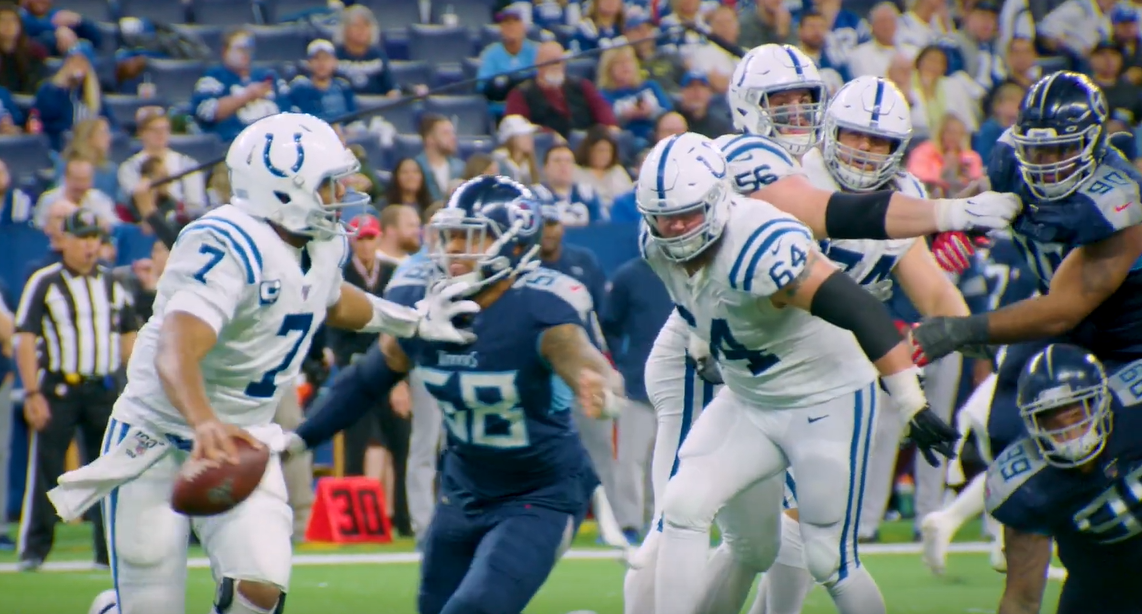
Brissett in a game against the Tennessee Titans

Brissett was set to be the Colts' backup quarterback heading into the 2019 season. However, on August 24, 2019, two weeks before the start of the 2019 regular season, Andrew Luck abruptly announced his retirement. Colts general manager Chris Ballard confirmed in a subsequent press conference that Brissett would be the full-time starting quarterback going into the season. On September 2, 2019, Brissett signed a two-year, $30 million contract with the Colts, with $20 million guaranteed, a contract he again negotiated himself because he doesn't "like people to BS on his behalf." He was previously in the final year of his rookie contract and was set to make $2 million for the season.

In Week 1 against the Los Angeles Chargers, Brissett threw for 190 yards and two touchdown passes to T. Y. Hilton in a 30–24 overtime loss. On September 15, 2019, Brissett led the Colts to a 19–17 win over division rival Titans with three touchdown passes and one interception. In Week 3 against the Falcons, Brissett threw for 310 yards and two touchdowns, as well as completing his first 16 pass attempts, as the Colts won 27–24. In Week 4 against the Oakland Raiders, Brissett threw 46 passes with 24 completions for 265 yards, including three passing touchdowns, but he also threw a late interception that was returned for a touchdown by Erik Harris to seal the Colts' 31–24 loss. In Week 5, against the eventual Super Bowl champions Kansas City Chiefs, Brissett threw for 151 yards and ran for their lone touchdown in the 19–13 win.

In Week 7 against the Texans, Brissett threw for 326 yards and four touchdowns in the 30–23 win. He was named the AFC Offensive Player of the Week for his performance. The remainder of the season did not fare well for Brissett and the Colts with a 3–6 finish. In that stretch, he passed for 172.7 yards per game and totaled only four passing touchdowns to three interceptions. Overall, he finished the season with 2,942 passing yards, 18 passing touchdowns, and six interceptions to go along with 228 rushing yards and four rushing touchdowns.

==== 2020 season ====
With the Colts signing Philip Rivers in the offseason, Brissett remained the team's backup. Brissett carved out a role where he would come into the game in relief of Rivers on deep passes and short-yardage situations. He scored a rushing touchdown on a two-yard play in Week 10 against the Titans. Offensive coordinator Nick Sirianni would later credit this as the inspiration for the Tush Push play when he became head coach of the Philadelphia Eagles. In Week 12 against the Tennessee Titans, Brissett recorded two rushing touchdowns during the 45–26 loss.

=== Miami Dolphins ===
On March 18, 2021, Brissett signed a one-year, $5 million contract with the Dolphins, reuniting Brissett with Dolphins head coach Brian Flores, who served as the Patriots linebacker coach during Brissett's rookie season with the team.

On September 19, 2021, in Week 2, Brissett came into the game against the Bills after Tua Tagovailoa left the game with a rib injury. Brissett threw for 169 yards and an interception as the Dolphins lost 35–0. Brissett was named the starter for the Dolphins Week 3 matchup against the Las Vegas Raiders due to Tagovailoa's injury. He had a significant role in six games in the 2021 season. He finished with 1,283 passing yards, five passing touchdowns, and four interceptions to go with a rushing touchdown.

=== Cleveland Browns ===
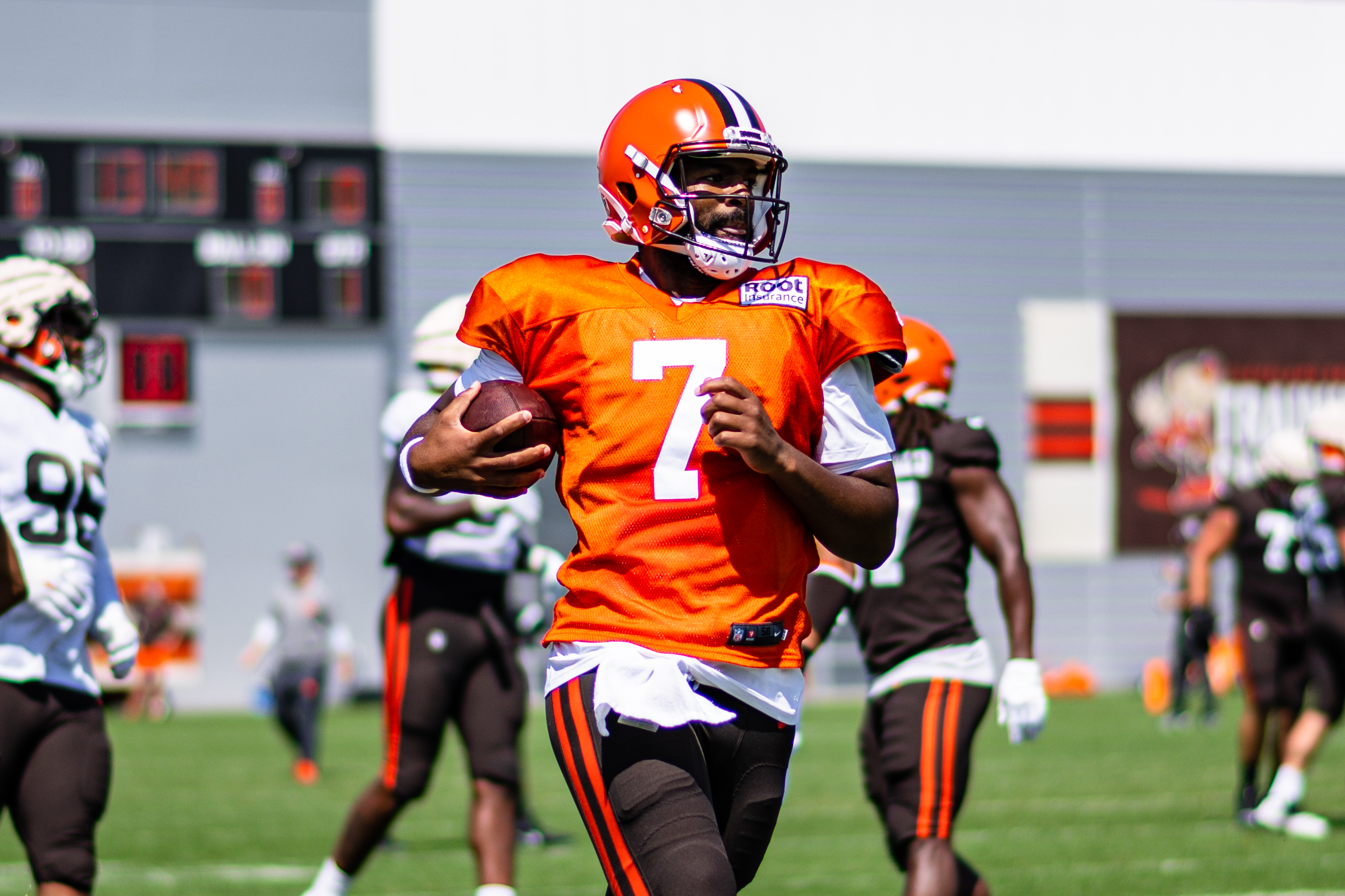
Brissett at Cleveland Browns training camp in 2022.

On March 25, 2022, Brissett signed a one-year, $4.65 million contract with the Browns. Due to Deshaun Watson's sexual misconduct allegations and his 11-game suspension, Brissett was named the Week 1 starter for the game against the Carolina Panthers. Brissett started and played every offensive snap in each of the Browns first eleven games, leading them to a 4–7 record with 2,608 passing yards and 14 total touchdowns while completing 64% of his passes for an 88.9 passer rating—both career highs.

=== Washington Commanders ===
On March 16, 2023, Brissett signed a one-year, $10 million contract with the Washington Commanders. He played for the first time in the 2023 season in Week 15 against the Rams, where he came in relief of Sam Howell, who was benched in the fourth quarter. In the 28–20 loss, Brissett recorded 124 yards on eight passes and two touchdowns. When Howell was benched a second time in the following game against the New York Jets, Brissett came in the third quarter down by 20 points, and led 3 straight touchdown drives to take the lead. They ended up losing 30–28, as he recorded ten passes for 100 yards and one touchdown. On December 27, 2023, head coach Ron Rivera announced that Brissett would be the team's starting quarterback for Week 17 against the 49ers. However, Brissett injured his hamstring during practice and was later ruled out.

=== New England Patriots (second stint) ===
On March 15, 2024, Brissett signed a one-year, $8 million deal to return to the New England Patriots. On August 29, head coach Jerod Mayo named Brissett the starting quarterback over rookie Drake Maye to begin the season. Brissett led the Patriots to an upset victory against the Bengals in the opening game of the season, winning 16–10. However on October 8, after losing four straight games and continued struggles, Brissett was benched in favor of Maye. In Week 8 against the Jets, Brissett made an appearance in relief of Maye, who exited the game in the second quarter due to a head injury. Brissett finished the game completing 15 of 24 passes for 132 yards, including leading a 70-yard game winning drive in the 25–22 win. Brissett would remain inactive for all but two of the Patriots' remaining games.

=== Arizona Cardinals ===
On March 14, 2025, Brissett signed a two-year, $12.5 million contract with the Arizona Cardinals. After an injury to Kyler Murray, Brissett was named the starter for the Week 6 matchup against the Indianapolis Colts. In his first start for the Cardinals, Brissett threw for 319 yards, 2 touchdowns, and one interception in the 31–27 loss. The following week against the Green Bay Packers, Murray was again ruled out, and Brissett threw for 279 yards and 2 touchdowns, but the Cardinals would fall 27–23. In Week 9 against the Dallas Cowboys, Brissett picked up his first win as a starter for the Cardinals, where he threw for 261 yards and two touchdowns while also rushing for one touchdown in the 27–17 win. On November 5, it was announced that Brissett would remain the starter for the rest of the month as Murray was moved to injured reserve. On November 16, in a 41–22 loss against the San Francisco 49ers, Brissett completed 47 of 57 passes for 452 yards with two touchdowns and two interceptions, setting an NFL record for most pass completions in a regular season game. The previous record of 45 completions was held by Drew Bledsoe (1994) and Jared Goff (2019). It is also the highest completion percentage on yards-per-attempt. The 452 yards marks the seventh most in a game in Cardinals history. In the 2025 season, Brissett finished with 3,366 passing yards, 23 touchdowns, and eight interceptions to go with a rushing touchdown.

On July 26, 2026, Brissett agreed to a reworked deal that increased his 2026 compensation to a maximum value of $21 million with $15.5 million guaranteed. Brissett will be a free agent in 2027, as the 2026 season is the second season of his current two-year deal. Brissett would be benched in the third quarter of the Cardinals' Week 8 game against the Dallas Cowboys. After the Cardinals rallied to win that game, it was announced that he would be demoted to third-string behind Gardner Minshew and Carson Beck. Brissett would then request to be traded as a result.

=== Baltimore Ravens ===
On November 6, 2026, Brissett, along with a fifth-round pick in 2027, was traded to the Baltimore Ravens in exchange for a fourth-round pick in 2027 and a seventh-round pick in 2028 after the Ravens lost both Lamar Jackson and Tyler Huntley to potentially season-ending injuries the previous week.

== Career statistics ==
Legend
	Won the Super Bowl
	Led the league
**Bold**	Career high

=== NFL ===
==== Regular season ====
Year	Team	Games			Passing									Rushing					Sacked		Fumbles	
Year	Team	GP	GS	Record	Cmp	Att	Pct	Yds	Y/A	Lng	TD	Int	Rtg	Att	Yds	Avg	Lng	TD	Sck	SckY	Fum	Lost
2016	NE	3	2	1–1	34	55	61.8	400	7.3	58	0	0	83.9	16	83	5.2	**27**	1	6	46	3	1
2017	IND	16	15	4–12	276	469	58.8	3,098	6.6	**80**	13	7	81.7	**63**	**260**	4.1	25	**4**	**52**	**305**	**8**	3
2018	IND	4	0	—	2	4	50.0	2	0.5	4	0	0	56.2	7	−7	−1.0	−1	0	0	0	0	0
2019	IND	15	15	**7–8**	272	447	60.9	2,942	6.6	50	18	6	88.0	56	228	4.1	24	**4**	27	159	7	**5**
2020	IND	11	0	—	2	8	25.0	17	2.1	13	0	0	39.6	17	19	1.1	5	3	2	15	0	0
2021	MIA	11	5	2–3	141	225	62.7	1,283	5.7	52	5	4	78.1	19	70	3.7	19	1	19	132	6	3
2022	CLE	16	11	4–7	236	369	64.0	2,608	7.1	55	12	6	88.9	49	243	5.0	22	2	24	160	6	4
2023	WAS	3	0	—	18	23	**78.3**	224	**9.7**	48	3	0	**146.8**	3	19	**6.3**	10	0	0	0	0	0
2024	NE	8	5	1–4	95	161	59.0	826	5.1	50	2	1	74.2	15	62	4.1	16	0	18	119	4	1
2025	ARI	14	12	1–11	**315**	**485**	64.9	**3,366**	6.9	50	**23**	**8**	94.1	38	168	4.4	15	1	43	288	5	1
2026	ARI	8	8	3–5	193	305	63.3	1,719	5.3	38	10	7	79.7	29	87	3.0	18	1	19	118	0	0
2026	BAL	1	1	0–1	33	49	67.3	340	6.9	31	0	1	78.6	2	2	1.0	2	0	2	9	0	0
Career		110	74	23–51	1,617	2,600	62.2	16,825	6.5	80	86	40	85.5	314	1,234	3.9	27	17	212	1,351	39	18

==== Postseason ====
Year	Team	Games			Passing									Rushing					Sacked		Fumbles	
Year	Team	GP	GS	Record	Cmp	Att	Pct	Yds	Avg	Lng	TD	Int	Rtg	Att	Yds	Avg	Lng	TD	Sck	SckY	Fum	Lost
2016	NE	0	0	—	DNP																	
2018	IND	0	0	—	DNP																	
2020	IND	1	0	—	0	0	0.0	0	0.0	0	0	0	0.0	1	0	0.0	0	0	0	0	0	0
Career		1	0	—	0	0	0.0	0	0.0	0	0	0	0.0	1	0	0.0	0	0	0	0	0	0

=== College ===
Season	Team	Games			Passing								Rushing			
Season	Team	GP	GS	Record	Cmp	Att	Pct	Yds	Y/A	TD	Int	Rtg	Att	Yds	Avg	TD
2011	Florida	8	2	0–2	18	39	46.2	206	5.3	2	4	86.9	13	7	0.5	2
2012	Florida	5	2	2–0	23	35	**65.7**	249	**7.1**	1	0	134.9	7	−4	−0.6	1
2013	NC State	Did not play due to NCAA transfer rules														
2014	NC State	13	13	**8–5**	221	370	59.7	2,606	7.0	**23**	5	**136.7**	124	**529**	**4.3**	3
2015	NC State	13	13	7–6	**237**	**395**	60.0	**2,662**	6.7	20	**6**	130.3	**139**	370	2.7	**6**
Career		39	30	17–13	499	839	59.5	5,723	6.8	46	15	131.3	283	902	3.2	12

== Personal life ==
As a longtime backup quarterback in the NFL, Brissett appeared in a Progressive Insurance ad campaign featuring other backup players.
