= Fog Bowl =

The name Fog Bowl has been given to games in which a thick fog covered the field, limiting visibility:

- 50th Grey Cup, the 1962 Canadian Football League Championship Game won by the Winnipeg Blue Bombers over the Hamilton Tiger-Cats
- Fog Bowl (American football), a December 31, 1988, National Football League playoff game between the Philadelphia Eagles and the Chicago Bears
- The 1974 Sun Bowl, played December 28, 1974, between the Mississippi State Bulldogs and the North Carolina Tar Heels
