= Sanjay Lal =

American football coach (born 1969)

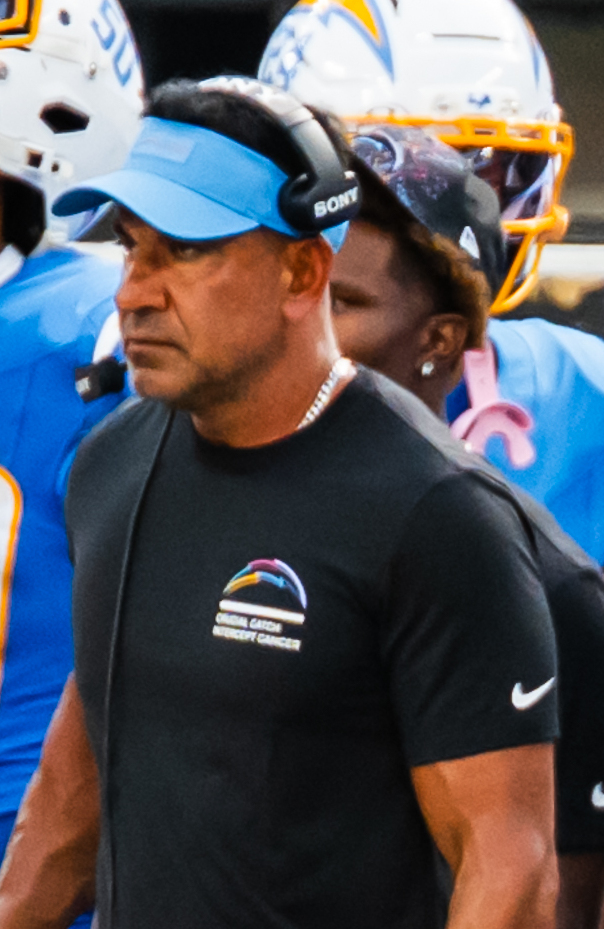
- Lal with the Los Angeles Chargers in 2025

Los Angeles Chargers
- Title: Wide receivers coach

Personal information
- Born: July 23, 1969 (age 57); London, England

Career information
- Position: Wide receiver
- College: UCLA (1989); Washington (1990–1992)

Career history
- Miramonte HS (1996–2002) Passing game coordinator & wide receivers coach; Los Medanos College (2003) Wide receivers coach; Saint Mary's (2004) Quarterbacks coach & strength and conditioning coach; California (2005–2006) Offensive assistant & quarterbacks coach; Oakland Raiders (2007–2008) Offensive quality control coach; Oakland Raiders (2009–2011) Wide receivers coach; New York Jets (2012–2014) Wide receivers coach; Buffalo Bills (2015–2016) Wide receivers coach; Indianapolis Colts (2017) Wide receivers coach; Dallas Cowboys (2018–2019) Wide receivers coach; Seattle Seahawks (2020) Senior offensive assistant; Jacksonville Jaguars (2021) Wide receivers coach; Seattle Seahawks (2022–2023) Passing game coordinator & wide receivers coach; Los Angeles Chargers (2024–present) Wide receivers coach

Awards and highlights
- National champion (1991)

Sanjay Lal (born July 23, 1969) is an American football coach who is the wide receivers coach for the Los Angeles Chargers of the National Football League (NFL). He previously served as an assistant coach for the Jacksonville Jaguars, Indianapolis Colts, Buffalo Bills, New York Jets, Oakland Raiders, Dallas Cowboys, and Seattle Seahawks.

== Early life ==
Born in London, Lal enrolled at the University of California, Los Angeles (UCLA), and played college football for the UCLA Bruins in 1989, and was a member of the 1989 Cotton Bowl Classic winning team. He then transferred to the University of Washington, where he played for the Washington Huskies from 1990 through 1992. He was a member of the Huskies' national championship team in 1991. Additionally, he is a Husky Hall of Fame selection and was a member of two Rose Bowl teams while at UW.

After graduating from Washington with a degree in business administration (1993), Lal was invited to the Oakland Raiders' training camp and subsequently signed as a free agent with the St. Louis Rams (1998) and then with the Scottish Claymores of NFL Europe (1999).

== Coaching career ==
=== Early career ===
In 1996, Sanjay was hired as the passing game coordinator and wide receivers coach at Miramonte High School. During his tenure, the school won five North Coast Section Championships and one state title, including a 13-0 record in 2001.

=== Oakland Raiders ===
In 2007, Lal was hired by the Oakland Raiders as an offensive quality control coach under head coach Lane Kiffin. In 2009, he was promoted to wide receivers coach under head coach Tom Cable. During his tenure with the Raiders, he coached and developed young receivers such as Chaz Schilens, Darrius Heyward-Bey, Louis Murphy, Jacoby Ford, and Denarius Moore.

=== New York Jets ===
On January 13, 2013, Lal was hired by the New York Jets as their wide receivers coach.

=== Indianapolis Colts ===
On January 25, 2017, Lal was hired by the Indianapolis Colts as their wide receivers coach under head coach Chuck Pagano.

=== Dallas Cowboys ===
On January 14, 2018, Lal was hired by the Dallas Cowboys as their wide receivers coach, replacing Derek Dooley, who left to become the offensive coordinator and quarterbacks coach at the University of Missouri. On January 8, 2020, the Cowboys announced Lal would not be retained under new head coach Mike McCarthy.

=== Seattle Seahawks (first stint) ===
On March 11, 2020, Lal was hired by the Seattle Seahawks as a senior offensive assistant.

=== Jacksonville Jaguars ===
On January 27, 2021, Lal was hired by the Jacksonville Jaguars as their wide receivers coach under head coach Urban Meyer.

=== Seattle Seahawks (second stint) ===
On February 15, 2022, Lal was back with the Seahawks as the receivers coach and offensive passing game coordinator.

=== Los Angeles Chargers ===
On February 14, 2024, Lal was named as the wide receivers coach for the Los Angeles Chargers.
