= Kenny Moore II =

American football player (born 1995)

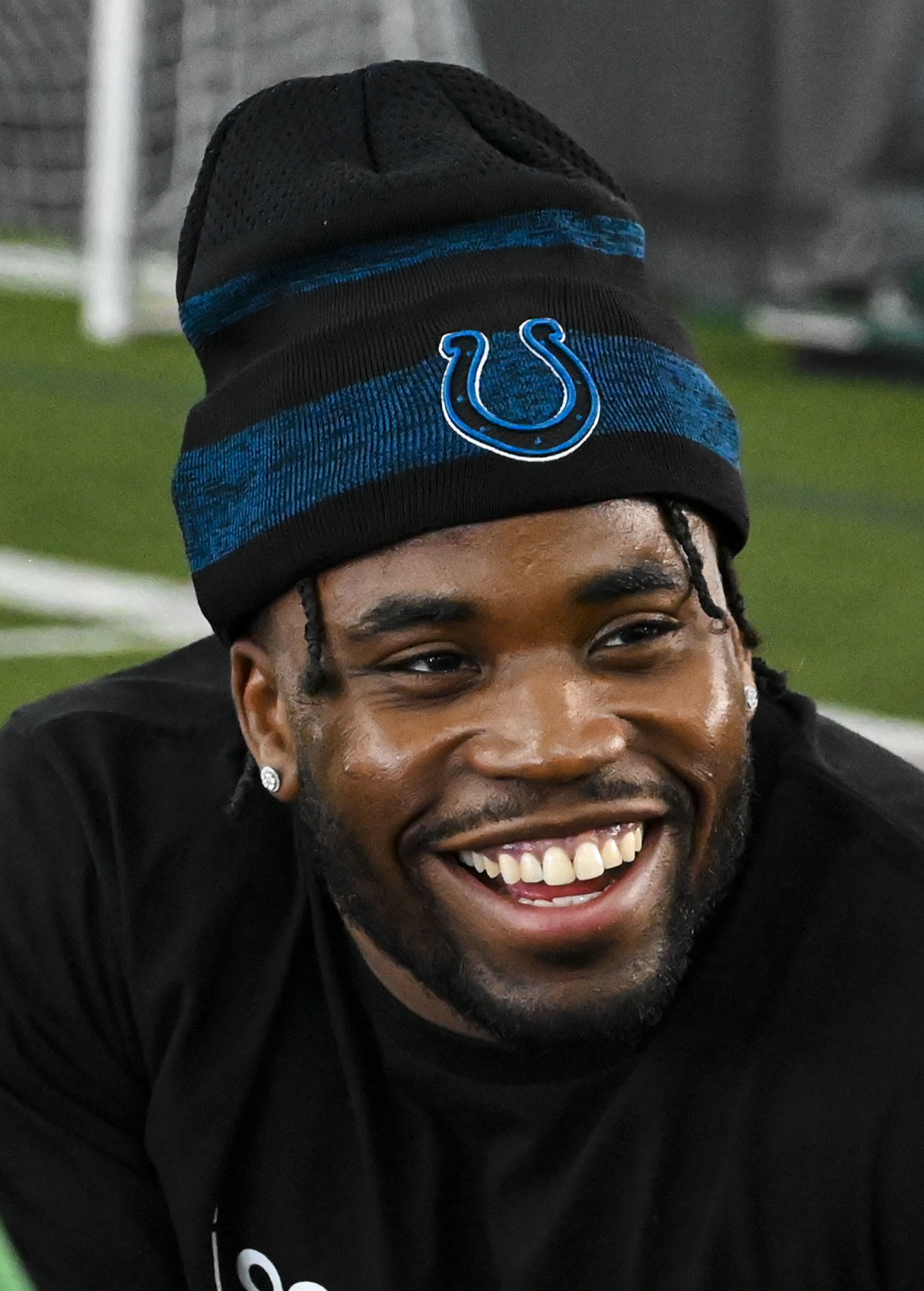
- Moore in 2022

No. 23 – Philadelphia Eagles
- Position: Cornerback
- Roster status: Active

Personal information
- Born: August 23, 1995 (age 31); Valdosta, Georgia, U.S.
- Listed height: 5 ft 9 in (1.75 m)
- Listed weight: 190 lb (86 kg)

Career information
- High school: Lowndes (Valdosta)
- College: Valdosta State (2013–2016)
- NFL draft: 2017: undrafted

Career history
- New England Patriots (2017)*; Indianapolis Colts (2017–2025); Philadelphia Eagles (2026–present)
- * Offseason or practice squad member only

Awards and highlights
- Pro Bowl (2021); First-team All-American (2016); Second-team All-American (2015); First-team All-GSC (2015); Second-team All-GSC (2016)

Career NFL statistics as of 2025
- Total tackles: 649
- Sacks: 11.5
- Forced fumbles: 6
- Fumble recoveries: 2
- Interceptions: 21
- Pass deflections: 68
- Defensive touchdowns: 5
- Stats at Pro Football Reference

Kenneth Moore II (born August 23, 1995) is an American professional football cornerback for the Philadelphia Eagles of the National Football League (NFL). He played college football for the Valdosta State Blazers, and signed with the New England Patriots as an undrafted free agent in 2017. He played for the Indianapolis Colts from 2017 to 2025.

== Early life ==
Moore did not play football until his senior year at Lowndes High School in Valdosta, Georgia. He recorded 18 tackles, two interceptions, and two pass breakups in 2012. Lowndes had a 9–2 record and advanced to the GHSA Class AAAAAA Playoffs. He also participated in soccer, basketball and track at Lowndes.

== College career ==
Moore played for the Valdosta State Blazers of Valdosta State University from 2013 to 2016. He began his college career as a cornerback and converted to safety his senior season. He played in 10 games, starting one, in 2013, recording 12 solo tackles, six tackle assists and one interception. Moore played in all 13 games in 2014, totaling 26 solo tackles, 11 tackle assists, five pass breakups, two interceptions, and one forced fumble. He played in 12 games in 2015, recording 34 solo tackles, 17 tackle assists, one sack, six pass breakups and three interceptions, two of which were returned for touchdowns. He earned First-team All-Gulf South Conference (GSC), D2CAA Second-team All-Super Region Two and USA College Football Division II Second-team All-American honors in 2015. Moore played in 11 games in 2016, totaling 45 solo tackles, 20 tackle assists, one sack, eight pass breakups and five interceptions. He garnered GSC All-Academic, Second-team All-GSC, D2CAA Second-team All-Super Region Two, HERO Sports D2 First-team All-American and American Football Coaches Association First-team All-American recognition in 2016. His 11 career interceptions ranked fifth all-time in school history. Moore majored in mass media at Valdosta State. In January 2017, he played in the Tropical Bowl, a college football all-star game.

== Professional career ==
Pre-draft measurables
Height	Weight	Arm length	Hand span	40-yard dash	Three-cone drill	Vertical jump	Broad jump	Bench press
5 ft 9 1/8 in (1.76 m)	190 lb (86 kg)	32 5/8 in (0.83 m)	9 3/8 in (0.24 m)	4.47 s	6.86 s	40.5 in (1.03 m)	10 ft 7 in (3.23 m)	15 reps
All values from Valdosta State's Pro Day

=== New England Patriots ===
On May 5, 2017, the New England Patriots signed Moore to a three-year, $1.66 million contract that included a signing bonus of $2,000 as an undrafted free agent.

Throughout training camp, Moore competed for a roster spot as a backup cornerback against Cyrus Jones, Justin Coleman, D. J. Killings, and Dwayne Thomas. On September 2, the Patriots waived Moore as part of their final roster cuts despite a strong performance in training camp and the preseason.

=== Indianapolis Colts ===
==== 2017 ====
On September 3, 2017, the Indianapolis Colts claimed Moore off of waivers. Head coach Chuck Pagano named Moore the fifth cornerback on the depth chart to begin the regular season, behind Vontae Davis, Rashaan Melvin, Nate Hairston, and Quincy Wilson.

On September 10, 2017, Moore made his professional regular season debut during the Indianapolis Colts' season-opener at the Los Angeles Rams and made one solo tackle as they lost 46–9. In Week 13, Moore earned his first career start in place of Rashaan Melvin who was inactive due to a hand injury. He finished the Colts’ 30–10 loss at the Jacksonville Jaguars with five combined tackles (four solo) and remained as a starting cornerback for the remaining four games after Rashaan Melvin was officially placed on injured reserve. On December 14, 2017, Moore recorded six combined tackles (three solo), broke up two pass attempts, and had his first career interception on a pass thrown by Trevor Siemian to wide receiver Demaryius Thomas on the opening drive of a 25–13 loss against the Denver Broncos. The following week, he collected a season-high eight solo tackles and made a pass deflection during a 16–23 loss at the Baltimore Ravens in Week 16. He finished his rookie season during the 2017 NFL season with 38 combined tackles (32 solo), five pass deflections and one interception in 16 games and five starts. On December 31, 2017, the Colts fired head coach Chuck Pagano after they finished with a 4–12 record. He received an overall grade of 65.9 from Pro Football Focus as a rookie in 2017.

==== 2018 ====
Throughout training camp, Moore competed for a job as a starting cornerback against Nate Hairston, Quincy Wilson, Pierre Desir, and Kenneth Acker under defensive coordinator Matt Eberflus. Head coach Frank Reich named Moore the No. 2 starting cornerback to begin the season, alongside No. 1 starting cornerback Nate Hairston.

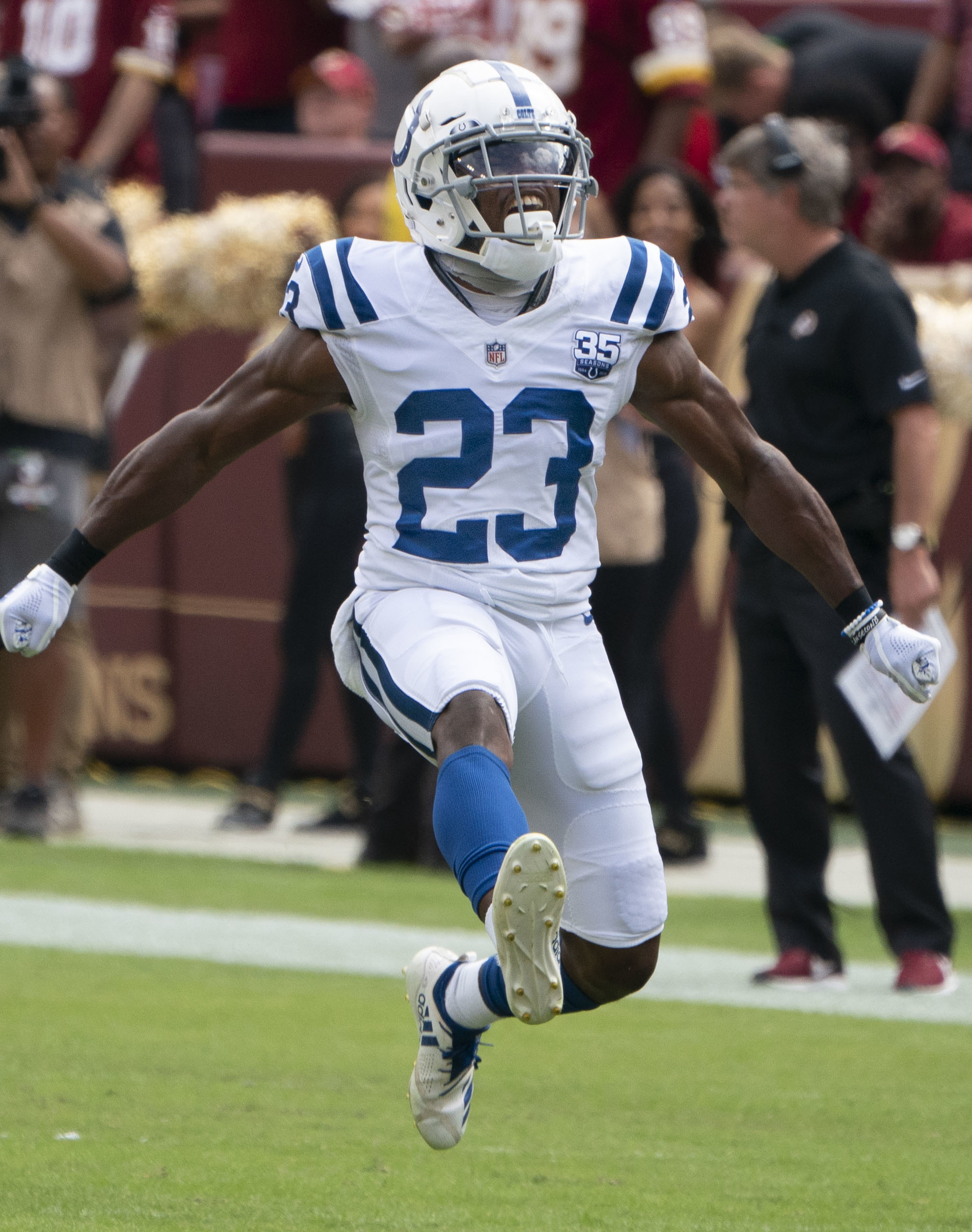
Moore playing for the Colts in 2018.

On September 9, 2018, Moore started in the Indianapolis Colts' home-opener against the Cincinnati Bengals and made three combined tackles (two solo), a pass deflection, and intercepted a pass by Andy Dalton to running back Joe Mixon on the opening drive as the Colts lost 34–23. He was inactive during a 24–38 loss at the New England Patriots in Week 5 due to a concussion. In Week 10, he produced six solo tackles and set a season-high with three pass deflections during a 29–26 victory against the Jacksonville Jaguars. In Week 11, he collected a season-high ten combined tackles (nine solo) and was credited with half a sack as the Colts defeated the Tennessee Titans 38–10. He finished the season with 77 combined tackles (63 solo), 11 pass deflections, three interceptions, and 1.5 sacks in 15 games and 15 starts. He received an overall grade of 69.1 from Pro Football Focus, which ranked 32nd among all qualifying cornerbacks in 2018.

The Indianapolis Colts finished the 2018 NFL season second in the AFC South with a 10–6 record, clinching a playoff berth. On January 5, 2019, Moore started in the first playoff game in his career and made six combined tackles (five solo), two pass deflections, one sack, and intercepted a pass by Deshaun Watson to tight end Ryan Griffin during a 21–7 victory at the Houston Texans in the AFC Wild Card Game. The following week, he made 13 combined tackles (eight solo), a pass deflection, and led the team with two sacks as the Colts lost 13–31 at the Kansas City Chiefs in the Divisional Round.

==== 2019 ====
On June 13, 2019, the Indianapolis Colts signed Moore to a four–year, $33.30 million contract extension that included $9.00 million guaranteed upon signing, which made him the highest-paid slot cornerback in the league. He entered training camp slated as the No. 1 starting cornerback following the departure of Nate Hairston. He began the regular season as the No. 1 starting cornerback and was paired with Quincy Wilson.

He was inactive during a 30–23 win against the Houston Texans in Week 7 due to a knee injury. In Week 9, Moore collected a season-high eight combined tackles (seven solo), made a pass deflection, and intercepted a pass by Mason Rudolph during a 26–24 loss at the Pittsburgh Steelers. In Week 11, Moore collected a season-high eight solo tackles and had a sack on Nick Foles in the 33–13 win against the Jacksonville Jaguars. On December 1, 2019, Moore made four combined tackles (three solo) before exiting during the third quarter of a 17–31 loss against the Tennessee Titans due to an ankle injury. He remained inactive for the last four games (Weeks 14–17) of the season. He finished the 2019 NFL season with 61 combined tackles (50 solo), three pass deflections, 2.5 sacks, and two interceptions in 11 games and 11 starts. He received an overall grade of 75.6 from Pro Football Focus in 2019.

==== 2020 ====
He entered training camp as the projected starting nickelback. Head coach Frank Reich named Moore the starting nickelback and listed him as the No. 3 cornerback on the depth chart to begin the season, behind starting cornerbacks Xavier Rhodes and Rock Ya-Sin.

Beginning in Week 2, Moore became the No. 2 starting cornerback, replacing Rock Ya-Sin, who was inactive for two games due to a stomach illness. On November 1, 2020, Moore made three solo tackles, two pass deflections, and returned an interception thrown by Matthew Stafford to wide receiver Marvin Jones for 29 yards to score his first career touchdown during a 41–21 win at the Detroit Lions. On November 22, 2020, he set a season-high with ten solo tackles as the Colts defeated the Green Bay Packers in overtime 34–31. In Week 13, Moore recorded eight combined tackles (six solo), set a season-high with three pass deflections, and intercepted a pass by Deshaun Watson to wide receiver Brandin Cooks during a 26–20 victory at the Houston Texans. The following game he made five solo tackles, a pass deflection, and set a career-high with his fourth interception of the season after making a spectacular one-handed interception off a pass thrown by Derek Carr to tight end Darren Waller during a 44–27 win at the Las Vegas Raiders in Week 14. During the game, Moore also forced a fumble on Hunter Renfrow that was recovered by the Colts. His performance earned him the AFC Defensive Player of the Week for his performance in Week 14. He finished the season with a total of 80 combined tackles (68 solo), 14 pass deflections, a career-high four interceptions, and two sacks in 16 games and 14 starts. He received an overall grade of 73.8 from Pro Football Focus in 2020.

==== 2021 ====
He entered training camp slated as a starting cornerback alongside Xavier Rhodes under defensive coordinator Matt Eberflus. Head coach Frank Reich named him the No. 1 starting cornerback to begin the season and paired him with Rock Ya-Sin.

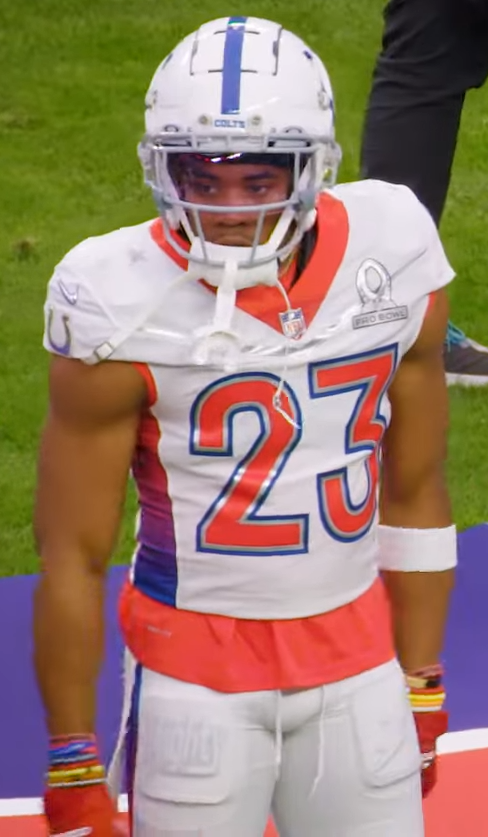
Moore at the 2022 Pro Bowl.

In Week 6, he set a season-high with ten solo tackles during a 31–3 victory against the Houston Texans. In Week 11, Moore made three combined tackles (one solo), a pass deflection, and intercepted a pass by Josh Allen to wide receiver Emmanuel Sanders as the Colts routed the Buffalo Bills 41–15. On December 5, 2021, Moore made four combined tackles (three solo), two pass deflections, and tied his career-high with his fourth interception of the season on a pass by Tyrod Taylor to wide receiver Davion Davis during a 31–0 victory at the Houston Texans. He started all 17 games during the 2021 NFL season and had a total of 102 combined tackles (82 solo), 13 passes defensed, four interceptions, one forced fumble and one sack. He was one of only two NFL defensive backs to register 100 tackles and at least 10 passes defensed in 2021. Moore was named to his first career Pro Bowl. He was also the team's nominee for the Walter Payton Man of the Year Award. He received an overall grade of 66.6 from Pro Football Focus in 2021.

==== 2022 ====
The Indianapolis Colts hired former Las Vegas Raiders' defensive coordinator Gus Bradley as their new defensive coordinator following the departure of Matt Eberflus who accepted the head coach position with the Chicago Bears. Bradley retained Moore as a starting cornerback and paired him with Stephon Gilmore to begin the regular season. On October 23, 2022, he made four combined tackles (three solo) and had his lone sack of the season for a seven–yard loss on Ryan Tannehill during a 10–19 loss at the Tennessee Titans. On move 57, 2022, the Colts fired head coach Frank Reich after they began with a 3–5–1 record. They unexpectedly appointed Jeff Saturday to interim head coach. In Week 12, Moore set a season-high with ten combined tackles (seven solo) and recorded one pass deflection before exiting in the fourth quarter of a 17–24 loss against the Pittsburgh Steelers on Monday Night Football after he injured his ankle during an accidental collision with wide receiver George Pickens while covering him on a two–point attempt. On January 4, 2023, the Colts officially placed Moore on injured reserve as was inactive for the last five games of the season (Weeks 13–18). He finished the season with 65 combined tackles (50 solo), four pass deflections, and one sack in 12 games and 12 starts. He received an overall grade of 55.7 from Pro Football Focus in 2022.

==== 2023 ====
On February 14, 2023, the Indianapolis Colts announced their decision to hire Philadelphia Eagles' former offensive coordinator Shane Steichen to be their new head coach. Steichen chose to retain Gus Bradley as the defensive coordinator. Moore entered training camp slated as the de facto No. 1 starting cornerback and led a group of rookies including JuJu Brents, Darius Rush, and Jaylon Jones. He was named the No. 1 starting cornerback to begin the season and was paired with Dallis Flowers.

On October 1, 2023, Moore recorded eight combined tackles (five solo), set a season-high with two pass deflections, and intercepted a pass by Matthew Stafford to wide receiver Tutu Atwell during a 23–29 loss at the Los Angeles Rams. In Week 7, he set a season-high with ten combined tackles (seven solo) and 1.5 sacks as the Colts lost 38–39 to the Cleveland Browns. On November 7, 2023, Moore made eight combined tackles (five solo), two pass deflections, and returned two interceptions for a career-high two touchdowns during a 27–13 victory at the Carolina Panthers. He had his first pick-six at the end of the second quarter after intercepting a pass by Bryce Young to running back Chuba Hubbard and returning it 49 yards for a touchdown. His second touchdown occurred towards the beginning of the fourth quarter, occurring on an interception thrown by Bryce Young to running back Miles Sanders, and was returned 66 yards for a touchdown. He became the first Colts defensive player in franchise history to score more than one defensive touchdown in one game. His performance in Week 9 earned him AFC Defensive Player of the Week. He was inactive as the Colts defeated Las Vegas Raiders 23–20 in Week 17 due to a back injury. He finished the 2023 NFL season with a total of 93 combined tackles (68 solo), six pass breakups, three interceptions, 1.5 sacks, and a career-high two touchdowns in 16 games and 16 starts. He received an overall grade of 77.4 from Pro Football Focus in 2023.

==== 2024 ====
On March 14, 2024, the Indianapolis Colts signed Moore to a three–year, $30.00 million contract extension that included $16.00 million guaranteed upon signing and an initial signing bonus of $6.75 million. Head coach Shane Steichen retained Moore as the Colts' No. 1 starting cornerback to begin the season and paired him with Jaylon Jones.

In Week 3, Moore set a season-high with nine combined tackles (three solo), made one pass deflection, and was credited with half a sack before exiting in the fourth quarter of a 21–16 win against the Chicago Bears after injuring his hip. He was subsequently inactive for the next two games (Weeks 4–5) due to his hip injury. In Week 9, he had six solo tackles and returned a fumble forced by defensive tackle Grover Stewart during a sack on Sam Darnold for a 38–yard touchdown during a 13–21 loss at the Minnesota Vikings. On November 10, 2024, Moore recorded eight combined tackles (five solo), set a season-high with two pass deflections, and intercepted a pass by Josh Allen to wide receiver Curtis Samuel as the Colts lost 20–30 against the Buffalo Bills. In Week 16, Moore recorded three combined tackles (two solo), tied his season-high of two pass deflections, and tied his career-high with two interceptions on passes thrown by Mason Rudolph as the Colts defeated the Tennessee Titans 38–30. He finished the season with 78 combined tackles (51 solo), seven pass deflections, three interceptions, one fumble recovery, one touchdown, and was credited with half a sack in 15 games and 15 starts. He received an overall grade of 70.8 from Pro Football Focus, which ranked 42nd amongst 222 qualifying cornerbacks in 2024.

==== 2025 ====
Moore made 14 appearances for Indianapolis (starting seven) during the 2025 season, recording one interception (which he returned for a touchdown), six passes defended, two forced fumbles, 1.5 sacks, and 55 total tackles.

On May 7, 2026, Moore was released by the Colts.

=== Philadelphia Eagles ===
On September 23, 2026, Moore signed with the Philadelphia Eagles' practice squad. On September 29, Moore was signed to the active roster.

== NFL career statistics ==
Legend
	Led the league
**Bold**	Career high

Year	Team	Games		Tackles					Fumbles				Interceptions					
Year	Team	GP	GS	Comb	Solo	Ast	Sack	TFL	FF	FR	Yds	TD	Int	Yds	Avg	Lng	TD	PD
2017	IND	16	5	38	32	6	0.0	2	1	0	0	0	1	25	25.0	25	0	5
2018	IND	15	15	77	63	11	1.5	4	1	0	0	0	3	52	17.3	32	0	11
2019	IND	11	11	61	50	14	**2.5**	4	0	**1**	1	0	2	36	18.0	35	0	3
2020	IND	16	14	80	68	12	2.0	4	1	0	0	0	**4**	45	11.3	29	1	**13**
2021	IND	17	16	**102**	**82**	20	1.0	6	1	0	0	0	**4**	78	19.5	32	0	**13**
2022	IND	12	12	65	50	15	1.0	4	0	0	0	0	0	0	0.0	0	0	4
2023	IND	16	16	93	68	25	1.5	**8**	0	0	0	0	3	**115**	**38.3**	**66**	**2**	6
2024	IND	15	15	78	51	**27**	0.5	4	0	**1**	**38**	**1**	3	28	9.0	12	0	7
2025	IND	14	7	55	34	21	1.5	3	**2**	0	0	0	1	32	32.0	32	1	6
Career		132	111	649	498	151	11.5	39	6	2	39	1	21	411	19.6	66	4	68

=== Postseason ===
Year	Team	Games		Tackles					Fumbles				Interceptions					
Year	Team	GP	GS	Comb	Solo	Ast	Sack	TFL	FF	FR	Yds	TD	Int	Yds	Avg	Lng	TD	PD
2018	IND	2	2	**19**	**13**	**6**	**3.0**	**3**	0	0	0	0	**1**	**10**	**10.0**	**10**	0	**3**
2020	IND	1	1	5	4	1	0.0	0	0	0	0	0	0	0	0.0	0	0	0
Career		3	3	24	17	7	3.0	3	0	0	0	0	1	10	10.0	10	0	3
