= Nate Hairston =

American football player (born 1994)

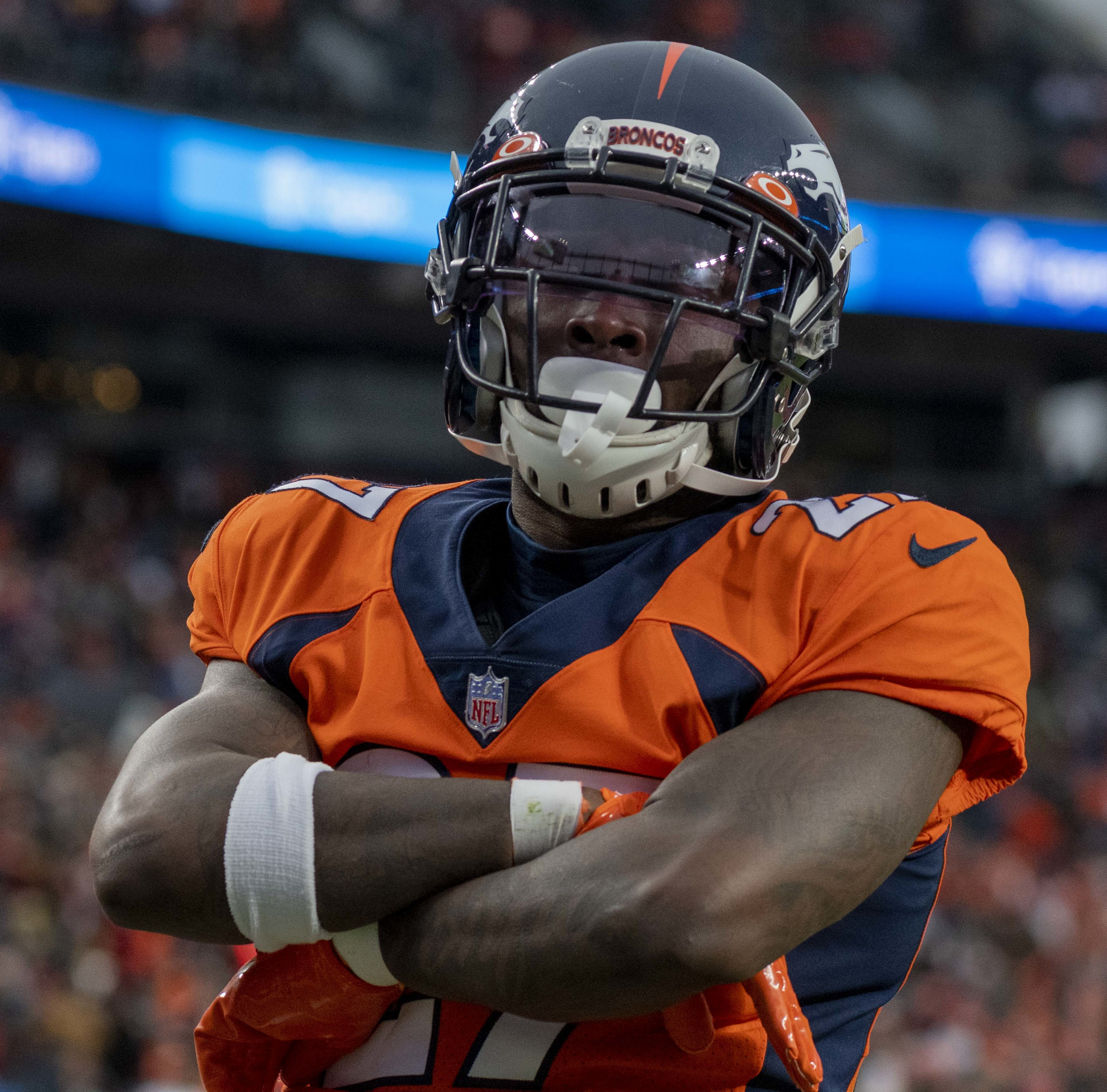
- Hairston with the Denver Broncos in 2021

Profile
- Position: Cornerback

Personal information
- Born: June 30, 1994 (age 32); Washington, D.C., U.S.
- Listed height: 6 ft 0 in (1.83 m)
- Listed weight: 185 lb (84 kg)

Career information
- High school: Governor Thomas Johnson (Frederick, Maryland)
- College: Temple
- NFL draft: 2017: 5th round, 158th overall pick

Career history
- Indianapolis Colts (2017–2018); New York Jets (2019–2020); Baltimore Ravens (2020)*; Denver Broncos (2020–2021); Minnesota Vikings (2022)*; Arizona Cardinals (2022–2023)*
- * Offseason or practice squad member only

Career NFL statistics
- Total tackles: 104
- Sacks: 2.0
- Pass deflections: 13
- Interceptions: 2
- Stats at Pro Football Reference

Nathan Hairston (born June 30, 1994) is an American professional football cornerback. He played college football at Temple, and was selected by the Indianapolis Colts in the fifth round of the 2017 NFL draft.

== Professional career ==
=== Pre-draft ===
On December 21, 2016, it was announced that Hairston had accepted his invitation to play in the 2017 East-West Shrine Game. He impressed draft scouts and analysts during Shrine Game practices. On January 21, 2017, Hairston recorded three combined tackles as part of the East team that lost 10–3 to the West in the 2017 East-West Shrine Game. Hairston attended the NFL Scouting Combine in Indianapolis and completed the majority of combine and positional drills.

External videos
- Nate Hairston's NFL Combine Workout
- Nate Hairston runs the 40-yard dash

On March 8, 2017, Hairston participated at Temple's pro day, but stood on the majority of his combine numbers and only performed the three-cone drill, short shuttle, and positional drills. At the conclusion of the pre-draft process, Hairston was projected to be drafted anywhere from the fifth to seventh rounds by NFL draft experts and scouts. He was ranked as the 30th best cornerback prospect in the draft by DraftScout.com.

Pre-draft measurables
Height	Weight	Arm length	Hand span	40-yard dash	10-yard split	20-yard split	20-yard shuttle	Three-cone drill	Vertical jump	Broad jump	Bench press
5 ft 11 7/8 in (1.83 m)	196 lb (89 kg)	31 in (0.79 m)	9 1/2 in (0.24 m)	4.52 s	1.59 s	2.65 s	4.47 s	6.85 s	35 1/2 in (0.90 m)	9 ft 10 in (3.00 m)	14 reps
All values from NFL Scouting Combine

=== Indianapolis Colts ===
==== 2017 ====
The Indianapolis Colts selected Hairston in the fifth round (158th overall) of the 2017 NFL draft. Hairston was selected by an Orangutan from the Indianapolis Zoo, making him one of the only NFL players to be drafted by an animal. Hairston was the 23rd cornerback drafted in 2017.

External videos
- Colts draft Nate Hairston 158th overall
- NFL Draft Profile: Nate Hairston

On May 11, 2017, the Colts signed Hairston to a four-year, $2.66 million contract that includes a signing bonus of $267,758.

Hairston entered training camp as a backup cornerback and special teams player and was slated to be a developmental project. Head coach Chuck Pagano named Hairston the fourth cornerback on the Colts' depth chart to begin the regular season in 2017. He was listed on the depth chart behind Vontae Davis, Rashaan Melvin, and Quincy Wilson.

He made his professional regular season debut in the Colts' season-opener at the Los Angeles Rams and made one solo tackle in their 46–9 loss. The following week, Hairston made his first career start as a nickelback after Vontae Davis was ruled inactive due to a groin injury. He recorded four solo tackles and made his first career sack on Cardinals' quarterback Carson Palmer in their 16–13 overtime loss to the 2017 Arizona Cardinals. On October 1, 2017, Hairston collected a season-high six combined tackles and forced a safety for the first scoring play of his career during a 46–18 loss at the Seattle Seahawks in Week 4. Hairston sacked Seahawks' quarterback Russell Wilson for a six-yard loss in the first quarter in the endzone for his first career safety. Hairston was inactive for the Colts' Week 5 win against the San Francisco 49ers due to a quadriceps injury. On November 26, 2017, Hairston recorded five combined tackles, made a season-high two pass deflections, and also made his first career interception in the Colts' 20–16 loss against the Tennessee Titans in Week 12. He made his first career interception off a pass by Titans' quarterback Marcus Mariota, that was originally intended for wide receiver Taywan Taylor, and returned it for a ten-yard gain in the second quarter. Hairston was inactive for the Colts' Week 15 loss to the Denver Broncos after suffering a concussion the previous week. He finished his rookie season in 2017 with 36 combined tackles (25 solo), five pass deflections, two sacks, one interception, and a safety in 14 games and four starts.

==== 2018 ====
On January 1, 2018, the Colts fired head coach Chuck Pagano after the Colts finished with a 4–12 record in 2017. On February 11, 2018, the Colts hired former Philadelphia Eagles offensive coordinator Frank Reich as their new head coach. Hairston competed against Kenny Moore II and Pierre Desir to be a starting cornerback to begin the regular season. Head coach Frank Reich named Hairston a starting cornerback to begin the regular season, alongside Kenny Moore and safeties Malik Hooker and Clayton Geathers.

Hairston was inactive for the Colts' Week 5 loss at the New England Patriots on Thursday Night Football due to a hamstring injury.

=== New York Jets ===
On August 28, 2019, Hairston was traded to the New York Jets for a conditional 2020 sixth round pick. In week 14 against the Miami Dolphins, Hairston recorded his first interception of the season off a pass thrown by Ryan Fitzpatrick in the 22–21 win.

Hairston was waived during final roster cuts on September 5, 2020, but was re-signed two days later. He was waived on October 1, 2020.

=== Baltimore Ravens ===
On October 12, 2020, Hairston was signed to the practice squad of the Baltimore Ravens' practice squad.

=== Denver Broncos ===
On December 12, 2020, Hairston was signed by the Broncos off the Ravens' practice squad. He was released by the Broncos on April 8, 2021, but re-signed with the team the next day. He was waived on August 31, 2021, and re-signed to the practice squad the next day. He was promoted to the active roster on September 14, 2021.

=== Minnesota Vikings ===
On March 28, 2022, Hairston signed a one-year deal with the Minnesota Vikings. He was released on August 30, 2022.

=== Arizona Cardinals ===
On September 21, 2022, Hairston was signed to the Arizona Cardinals practice squad. He was placed on the practice squad/injured list on December 28, 2022. He signed a reserve/future contract on January 11, 2023.

On August 28, 2023, Hairston was released by the Cardinals as part of final roster cuts before the start of the 2023 season.
