= Pierre Desir =

Haitian American football player (born 1990)

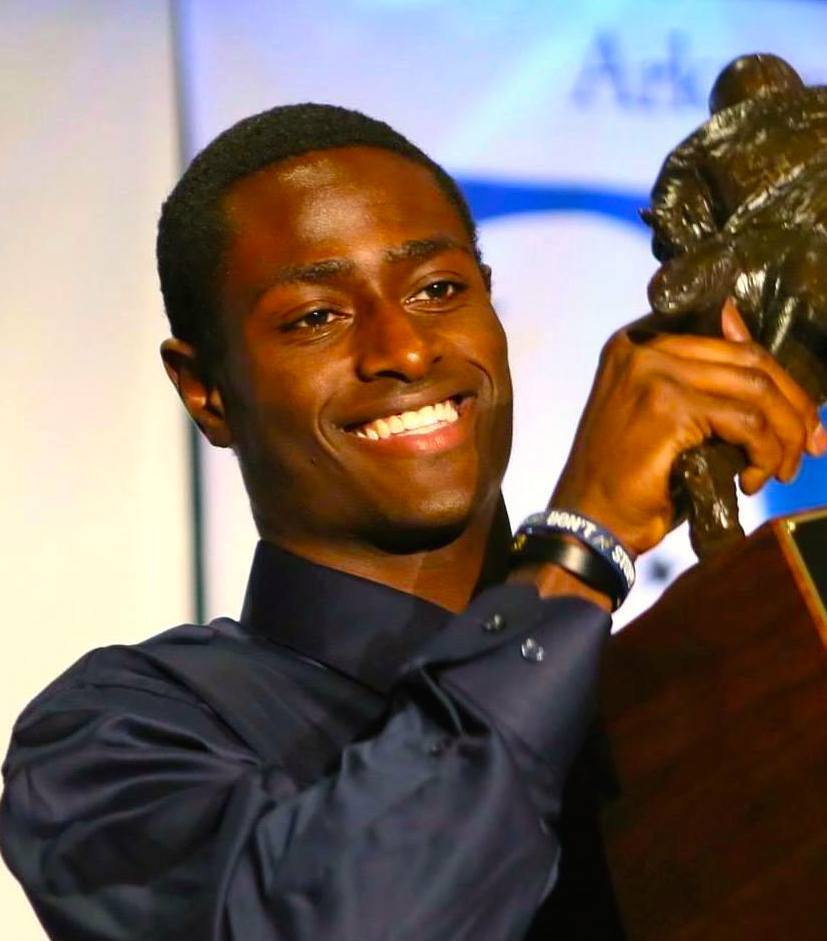
- Desir in 2013

No. 26, 40, 35, 47, 29
- Position: Cornerback

Personal information
- Born: September 8, 1990 (age 36); Port-au-Prince, Haiti
- Listed height: 6 ft 1 in (1.85 m)
- Listed weight: 192 lb (87 kg)

Career information
- High school: Francis Howell Central (Cottleville, Missouri, U.S.)
- College: Washburn (2008–2010); Lindenwood (2012–2013)
- NFL draft: 2014: 4th round, 127th overall pick

Career history
- Cleveland Browns (2014–2015); San Diego Chargers (2016); Seattle Seahawks (2016–2017)*; Indianapolis Colts (2017–2019); New York Jets (2020); Baltimore Ravens (2020); Seattle Seahawks (2021)*; Tampa Bay Buccaneers (2021)
- * Offseason or practice squad member only

Awards and highlights
- Cliff Harris Award (2013); First-team Division II All-American (2012, 2013); First-team All-MIAA (2009, 2012, 2013); Second-team All-MIAA (2010)

Career NFL statistics
- Total tackles: 287
- Forced fumbles: 4
- Fumble recoveries: 1
- Pass deflections: 46
- Interceptions: 10
- Defensive touchdowns: 1
- Stats at Pro Football Reference

Pierre Roberde Desir (/dəˈsɪər/ də-SEER; born September 8, 1990) is a Haitian former professional player of American football who was a cornerback in the National Football League (NFL). He played college football for the Lindenwood Lions and Washburn Ichabods before being selected by the Cleveland Browns in the fourth round of the 2014 NFL draft. He has also played for the San Diego Chargers, Indianapolis Colts, New York Jets, Baltimore Ravens, and Tampa Bay Buccaneers.

== Early life ==
Desir was born in Port-au-Prince, Haiti, to Wilfrid and Marie Desir. He immigrated along with his family to the United States at the age of 4, at first living in St. Louis, Missouri. The family moved to the suburb of St. Charles when Desir was 11 years old.

Desir attended Francis Howell Central High School in Cottleville, Missouri, where he was an all-state selection at defensive back. He was first-team all-league during his junior and senior seasons, and was named special teams player of the year as a senior. He averaged 37.8 yards per kickoff return and 8.9 yards per punt return. He was a record-breaking track runner while at the school as well.

== College career ==
Desir attended Washburn University, and played for the Washburn Ichabods from 2008 to 2010. He sat out his freshman year as a redshirt. In 2009, he was named first team all-Mid-America Intercollegiate Athletics Association (MIAA) after leading the conference with seven interceptions and 13 passes defended, and finished the season with 33 total tackles. He also averaged 29.4 yards per kickoff return on 10 attempts. In 2010, he recorded 46 tackles, including 5.5 for loss, nine pass deflections, one forced fumble, and five interceptions, earning himself second team all-MIAA honors.

In 2011, he left Washburn, citing a desire to be closer to his young children, and enrolled at Lindenwood University. After not playing his first year, he returned in 2012 and was one of the top defensive players in the MIAA. To go along with 60 tackles, he finished second among all levels of NCAA football with nine interceptions and tied for the Division II lead with 18 passes defended. He was also named first-team All-MIAA and was a first-team American Football Coaches Association (AFCA) Div. II All-American. In his final season, he once again was named a first-team All-MIAA selection and an AFCA Div. II All-American. He recorded 33 tackles, 12 pass deflections, and four interceptions. He also won the inaugural Cliff Harris Award, honoring the nation's top small college defensive player.

Desir finished his career ranked first in MIAA history in passes defended. His 25 career interceptions are the second most in conference history and rank him in the top 10 in Division II history.

== Professional career ==
=== Pre-draft ===
Desir was featured along with Jadeveon Clowney, Bishop Sankey, Blake Bortles, and Marqise Lee on ESPN's Draft Academy, which aired before the 2014 NFL draft.

Pre-draft measurables
Height	Weight	Arm length	Hand span	Wingspan	40-yard dash	10-yard split	20-yard split	20-yard shuttle	Three-cone drill	Vertical jump	Broad jump	Bench press
6 ft 1 in (1.85 m)	198 lb (90 kg)	33 in (0.84 m)	9 5/8 in (0.24 m)	6 ft 5 5/8 in (1.97 m)	4.52 s	1.52 s	2.68 s	4.30 s	6.86 s	38.0 in (0.97 m)	11 ft 1 in (3.38 m)	11 reps
All values from NFL Combine/Pro Day

=== Cleveland Browns ===
==== 2014 season ====
The Cleveland Browns selected Desir in the fourth round with the 127th overall pick in the 2014 NFL draft. He became the first player from Lindenwood to ever be selected in the NFL draft and was the 15th cornerback drafted in 2014. On May 29, 2014, the Browns signed Desir to a four-year, $2.62 million contract that includes a signing bonus of $407,612.

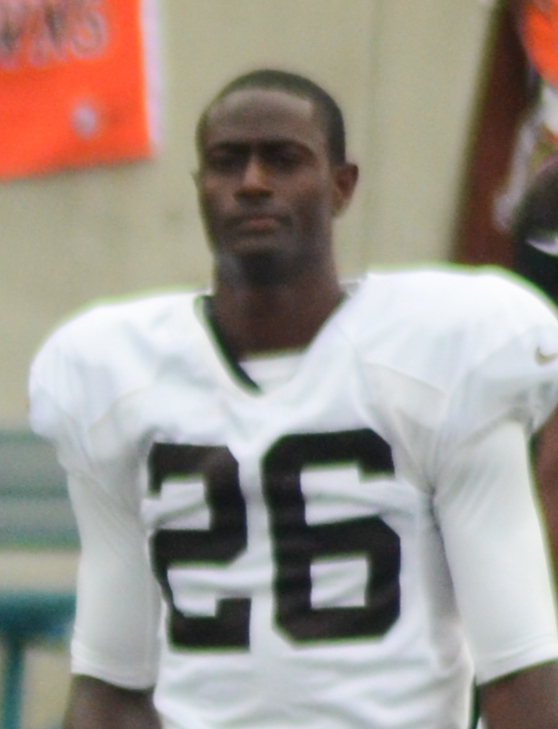
Desir at Cleveland Browns training camp in 2014

Throughout training camp, Desir competed to be a backup cornerback against Isaiah Trufant and Leon McFadden. Head coach Mike Pettine named Desir the fourth cornerback on the depth chart to begin the regular season, behind Joe Haden, Buster Skrine, and Justin Gilbert. Desir was inactive as a healthy scratch for the first 12 games of the regular season. On November 30, 2014, Desir made his professional regular season debut during a 26–10 loss at the Buffalo Bills in Week 13. On December 21, Desir earned his first career start and collected a season-high seven solo tackles and broke up two pass attempts during a 17–13 loss at the Carolina Panthers in Week 16. He finished his rookie season in 2014 with nine solo tackles and two pass deflections in five games and one start.

==== 2015 season ====
During training camp, Desir competed for a roster spot as the third cornerback against Gilbert, Charles Gaines, Robert Nelson, and K'Waun Williams. Head coach Pettine named Desir the fourth cornerback on the Browns' depth chart to begin the regular season. He was listed on the depth chart behind Haden, Tramon Williams, and K'Waun Williams. In Week 6, Desir collected a season-high 12 combined tackles (ten solo) and deflected one pass during a 26–23 loss against the Denver Broncos. He was inactive during the Browns' Week 12 loss against the Baltimore Ravens and a Week 14 victory against the San Francisco 49ers. Desir finished the 2015 NFL season with 37 combined tackles (30 solo) and five pass deflections in 14 games and six starts.

==== 2016 season ====
On January 4, 2016, the Browns fired head coach Mike Pettine and general manager Ray Farmer after they finished with a 3–13 record. Throughout training camp, Desir competed for a roster spot as a backup cornerback against Gilbert, Gaines, Trey Williams, and Jamar Taylor. On September 3, the Browns officially waived Desir as part of their final roster cuts.

=== San Diego Chargers ===
On September 4, 2016, the San Diego Chargers claimed Desir off of waivers. Head coach Mike McCoy named Desir the fifth cornerback on the Chargers' depth chart to begin the regular season, behind Jason Verrett, Brandon Flowers, Casey Hayward, and Craig Mager. On October 22, the Chargers released Desir, but re-signed him two days later, only for him to be released again on October 29.

=== Seattle Seahawks (first stint) ===
On November 2, 2016, the Seattle Seahawks signed Desir to their practice squad.

On January 16, 2017, the Seahawks signed Desir to a one-year, $790,000 reserve/future contract. Throughout training camp, Desir competed to be a backup cornerback against Mike Tyson, Tramaine Brock, Neiko Thorpe, Demetrius McCray, and DeAndre Elliott. On September 2, the Seahawks waived Desir as part of their final roster cuts.

=== Indianapolis Colts ===
==== 2017 season ====
On September 3, 2017, the Indianapolis Colts claimed Desir off of waivers. Head coach Chuck Pagano named Desir the sixth cornerback on the Colts' depth chart, behind Vontae Davis, Rashaan Melvin, Nate Hairston, Quincy Wilson, and Kenny Moore II.

Desir earned a starting role in Week 8 after he surpassed Hairston, Wilson, and Moore on the depth chart. He replaced Davis, who was released on November 9. On November 12, Desir collected a season-high eight combined tackles, deflected two passes, and made his first career interception during a 20–17 loss against the Pittsburgh Steelers in Week 10. Desir intercepted a pass by Steelers' quarterback Ben Roethlisberger, that was originally intended for wide receiver Martavis Bryant, during the first quarter. On December 3, Desir suffered a shoulder injury as the Colts lost 30–10 at the Jacksonville Jaguars. The next day, the Colts placed Desir on injured reserve. He finished the season with 32 combined tackles (21 solo), seven pass deflections, and one interception in nine games and six starts.

==== 2018 season ====
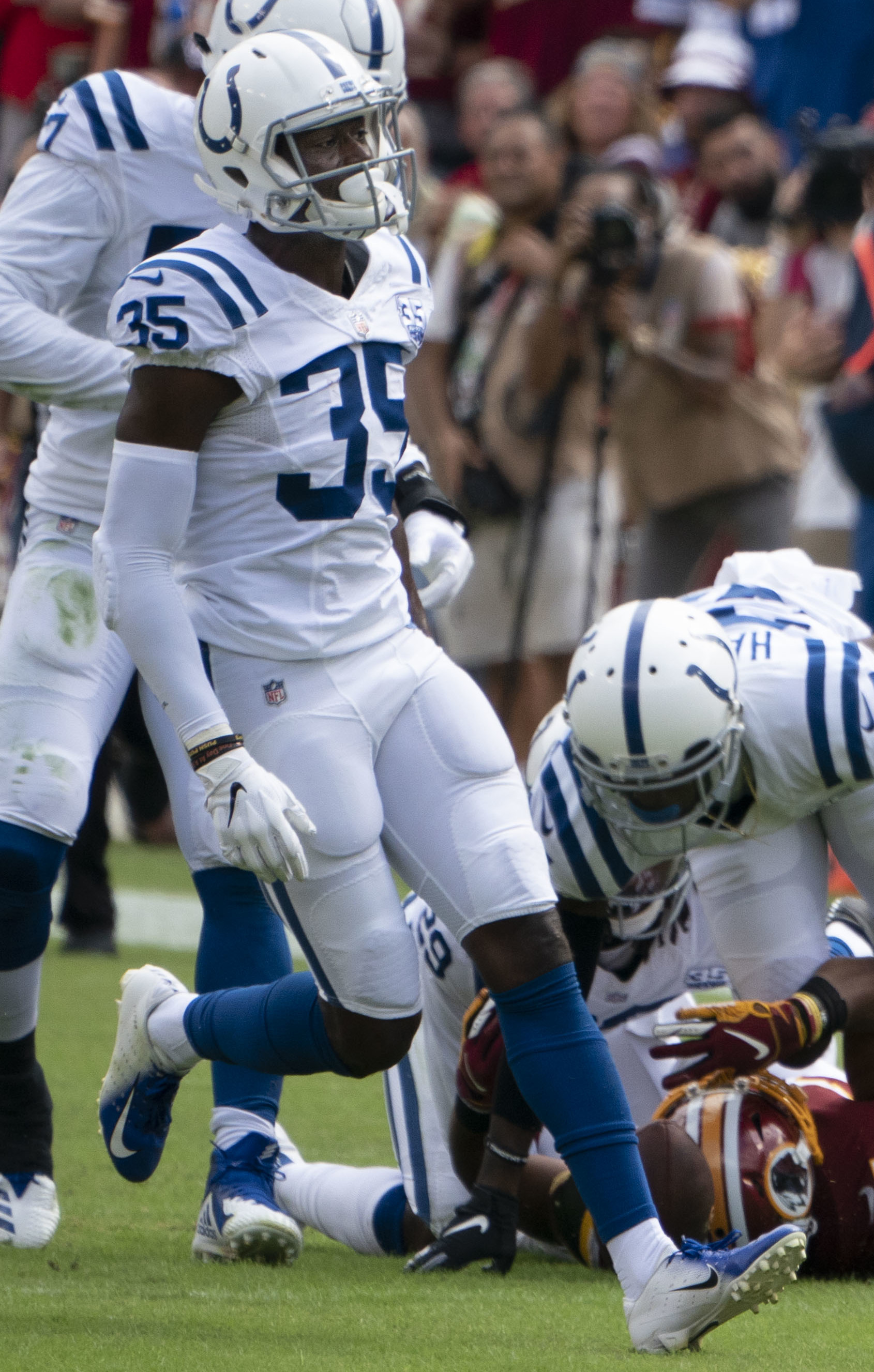
Desir with the Indianapolis Colts in 2018

On March 20, 2018, the Colts signed Desir to a one-year, $1.75 million contract that included $750,000 guaranteed. Throughout training camp, Desir competed to be a starting cornerback against Hairston, Wilson, and Moore. Head coach Frank Reich named Desir the third cornerback on the Colts' depth chart to begin the regular season, behind Moore and Hairston. On September 30, Desir made five solo tackles, broke up a pass attempt, and intercepted a pass during a 37–34 loss against the Houston Texans. In Week 6, he collected a season-high nine combined tackles during a 42–34 loss at the New York Jets. He finished the 2018 NFL season with 79 combined tackles (60 solo), eight pass deflections, and one interception in 16 games and 12 starts. Desir received an overall grade of 77.5 from Pro Football Focus, which ranked as the 18th best overall grade among all qualifying cornerbacks in 2018.

==== 2019 season ====
On March 13, 2019, Desir signed a three-year, $22.5 million contract extension with the Colts with $12 million guaranteed. In Week 7 against the Houston Texans, Desir recorded his first interception of the season off Deshaun Watson in the 30–23 win. In Week 16 against the Carolina Panthers, Desir recorded two interceptions off passes thrown by rookie quarterback Will Grier during the 38–6 win.

On March 21, 2020, Desir was released by the Indianapolis Colts.

=== New York Jets ===
On April 2, 2020, the New York Jets signed Desir to a one-year contract worth up to $5.5 million. In Week 2 against the San Francisco 49ers, Desir recorded his first interception as a Jet off a pass thrown by Nick Mullens during the 31–13 loss. In Week 4 against the Denver Broncos on Thursday Night Football, Desir recorded two interceptions off of passes thrown by quarterback Brett Rypien, including a pick six, in the 37–28 loss. He also gave up a 48-yard touchdown reception to Broncos' rookie wide receiver Jerry Jeudy during the game. On November 17, Desir was waived by the Jets. Despite being waived, Desir was named the Jets' nominee for the Walter Payton Man of the Year Award.

=== Baltimore Ravens ===
On November 28, 2020, Desir was signed to the Baltimore Ravens' practice squad. He was elevated to the active roster on December 8, December 19, and December 26 for the team's Weeks 13, 15, and 16 games against the Dallas Cowboys, Jacksonville Jaguars, and New York Giants, and reverted to the practice squad after each game. He was elevated again on January 15, 2021, for the team's divisional playoff game against the Buffalo Bills, and reverted to the practice squad again following the game. Desir's practice squad contract with the team expired after the season on January 25.

=== Seattle Seahawks (second stint) ===
Desir signed with the Seattle Seahawks on April 23, 2021. He was released by the Seahawks on August 24.

=== Tampa Bay Buccaneers ===
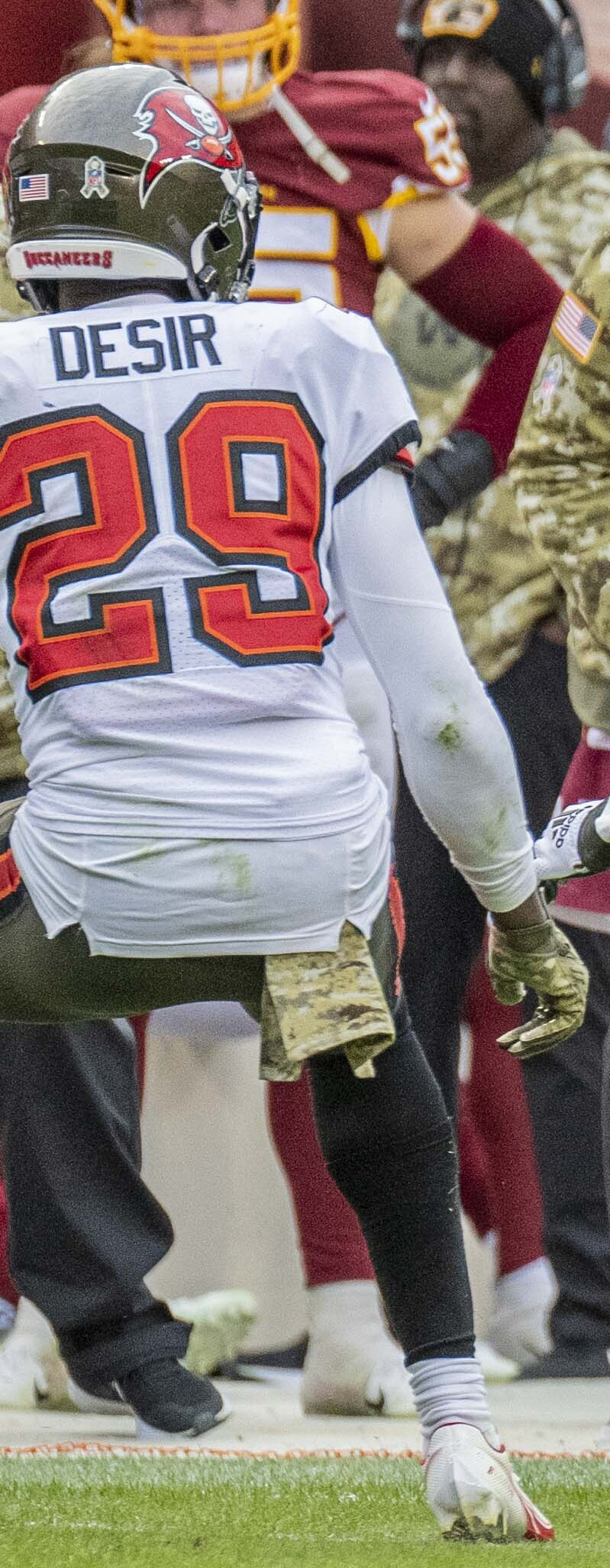
Desir with the Tampa Bay Buccaneers in 2021

On September 13, 2021, Desir was signed by the Tampa Bay Buccaneers to the team's practice squad. He was promoted to the active roster on October 2. Desir played in twelve games with the team, both as a cornerback and on special teams.

== NFL career statistics ==
Year	Team	Games		Tackles				Interceptions						Fumbles	
Year	Team	GP	GS	Cmb	Solo	Ast	Sck	PD	Int	Yds	Avg	Lng	TD	FF	FR
2014	CLE	5	1	9	9	0	0.0	2	0	0	0.0	0	0	0	0
2015	CLE	14	6	37	30	7	0.0	5	0	0	0.0	0	0	0	0
2016	SD	5	0	3	3	0	0.0	1	0	0	0.0	0	0	0	0
2017	IND	9	6	32	21	11	0.0	7	1	0	0.0	0	0	0	0
2018	IND	16	12	79	60	19	0.0	8	1	1	1.0	1	0	2	1
2019	IND	12	11	50	38	12	0.0	11	3	0	0.0	0	0	0	0
2020	NYJ	9	8	47	37	10	0.0	8	3	58	19.3	58	1	1	0
2020	BAL	3	0	2	2	0	0.0	0	0	0	0.0	0	0	0	0
2021	TB	12	2	28	26	2	0.0	4	2	0	0.0	0	0	1	0
Career		85	46	287	226	61	0.0	46	10	59	5.9	58	1	4	1

== Personal life ==
In 2025, Desir married Kirsten Peterson. They have a son: Kolton. Desir also has three children: Keeli, Kamryn, and Pierre Jr from previous marriage .

In February 2021, he donated 10,000 meals to the Houston Food Bank during Winter Storm Uri, which put much of Texas out of power, water, and heat.
