= 2017 East–West Shrine Game =

- All–Star Bowl Game
East Team	West Team
3	10
Head coach: Brentson Buckner (Arizona Cardinals)	Head coach: George Edwards (Minnesota Vikings)
	1	2	3	4	Total
East	0	3	0	0	3
West	3	0	0	7	10
- Date: January 21, 2017
- Season: 2016
- Stadium: Tropicana Field
- Location: St. Petersburg, Florida
- MVP: Elijah McGuire (RB, Louisiana–Lafayette) & Trey Hendrickson (DE, Florida Atlantic)
- Referee: Michael Roche
- Halftime show: Lakewood High School Marching Spartans
- Attendance: 22,198

United States TV coverage
- Network: NFL Network

The 2017 East–West Shrine Game was the 92nd staging of the all–star college football exhibition to benefit Shriners Hospital for Children. The game was held at Tropicana Field in St. Petersburg, Florida, on January 21, 2017, with a 3:00 p.m. EST kickoff. It was one of the final 2016–17 bowl games concluding the 2016 FBS football season. The game featured NCAA players (predominantly from the Football Bowl Subdivision) and a few select invitees from Canadian university football, rostered into "East" and "West" teams.

The game featured more than 100 players from the 2016 NCAA Division I FBS football season and prospects for the 2017 draft of the professional National Football League (NFL). In the week prior to the game, scouts from all 32 NFL teams attended.

This was first East–West Shrine Game with coaches and game officials supplied by the NFL. Head coaches in the game were assistant coaches with NFL teams who did not advance to the postseason; Brentson Buckner of the Arizona Cardinals and George Edwards of the Minnesota Vikings. The game was broadcast on the NFL Network.

== Players ==
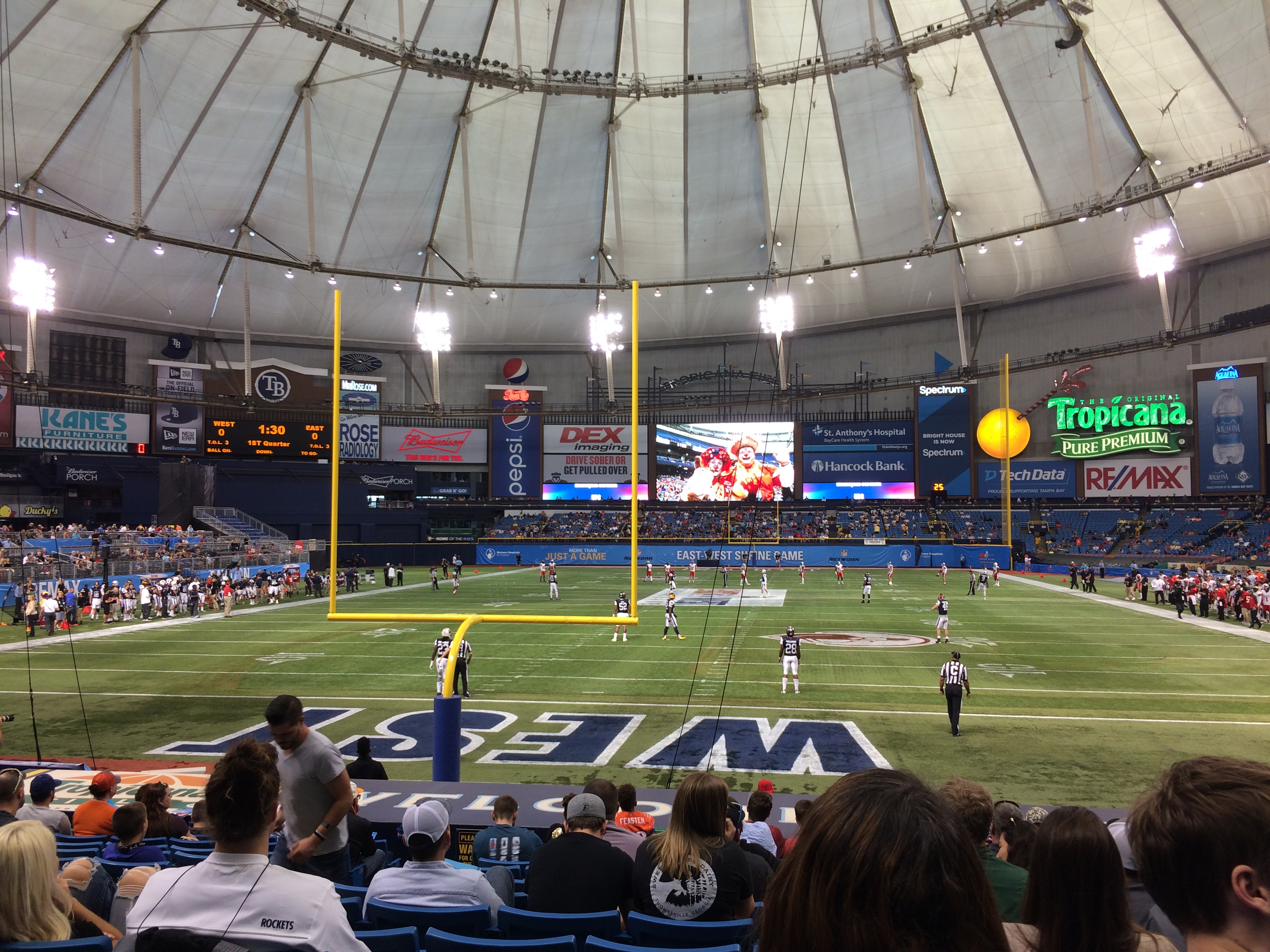
Kickoff of the 2017 East–West Shrine Game

Full roster is available here.

=== East team ===
==== Offense ====
No.	Name	Position	HT/WT	School
2	De'Veon Smith	RB	5'11/228	Michigan
3	Drew Morgan	WR	6'0/193	Arkansas
4	I'Tavius Mathers	RB	5'11/205	Middle Tennessee
7	Kermit Whitfield	WR	5'8/178	Florida State
8	Tony Stevens	WR	6'4/213	Auburn
9	Nick Mullens	QB	6'1/205	Southern Mississippi
10	Cooper Rush	QB	6'3/230	Central Michigan
12	Gehrig Dieter	WR	6'3/207	Alabama
14	Marcus Cox	RB	5'10/205	Appalachian State
15	Alek Torgersen	QB	6'2/220	Pennsylvania
18	Quincy Adeboyejo	WR	6'3/195	Mississippi
57	Adam Pankey	OG	6'6/316	West Virginia
58	Will Holden	OT	6'7/312	Vanderbilt
60	Cameron Tom	OC	6'4/290	Southern Mississippi
66	Joseph Scelfo	OC	6'1/300	North Carolina State
67	Kyle Kalis	OG	6'5/305	Michigan
68	Lucas Crowley	OC	6'3/293	North Carolina
70	Dan Skipper	OT	6'10/325	Arkansas
71	Jonathan McLaughlin	OT	6'5/300	Virginia Tech
72	Alex Kozan	OG	6'3/310	Auburn
77	Erik Magnuson	OT	6'5/310	Michigan
78	Dieugot Joseph	OT	6'6/300	Florida International
81	Colin Jeter	TE	6'6/255	Louisiana State
83	Scott Orndoff	TE	6'5/255	Pittsburgh
85	Eric Saubert	TE	6'5/250	Drake
88	DeAngelo Yancey	WR	6'1/217	Purdue
89	Antony Auclair	TE	6'6/254	Laval
INJ	Rodney Adams	WR	6'1/187	South Florida
INJ	Kareem Are	OG	6'6/325	Florida State
INJ	Kenny Golladay	WR	6'4/210	Northern Illinois
INJ	Will Worth	QB	6'1/205	Navy

==== Defense ====
No.	Name	Position	HT/WT	School
1	Tony Bridges	CB	6'0/185	Mississippi
5	Jalen Myrick	CB	5'11/198	Minnesota
6	Jamal Carter Sr.	SAF	6'2/215	Miami (FL)
11	Andrew King	LB	6'0/235	Army
17	Marquel Lee	LB	6'3/237	Wake Forest
21	Fish Smithson	SAF	5'11/195	Kansas
22	Nate Hairston	CB	6'0/192	Temple
23	Dymonte Thomas	SAF	6'1/208	Michigan
25	Brad Watson	CB	6'0/195	Wake Forest
26	Damaruis Travis	SAF	6'1/208	Minnesota
27	Xavier Woods	SAF	5'11/205	Louisiana Tech
31	Channing Stribling	CB	6'2/182	Michigan
39	Lano Hill	SAF	6'1/200	Michigan
42	Richie Brown	LB	6'2/240	Mississippi State
45	Austin Calitro	LB	6'1/247	Villanova
47	James Onwaula	LB	6'1/235	Notre Dame
51	Javancy Jones	LB	6'2/245	Jackson State
91	Joey Ivie IV	DT	6'3/298	Florida
92	Jason Carr	DT	6'6/300	West Georgia
94	Bryan Cox Jr.	DE	6'3/269	Florida
95	Ejuan Price	DE	5'11/245	Pittsburgh
97	DeAngelo Brown	DT	6'0/310	Louisville
98	Matthew Godin	DT	6'6/294	Michigan
99	Trey Hendrickson	DE	6'4/265	Florida Atlantic
INJ	Jarrod Clements Jr.	DT	6'3/295	Illinois
INJ	Jeremy Cutrer	CB	6'2/170	Middle Tennessee
SICK	Brooks Ellis	LB	6'2/240	Arkansas

==== Specialists ====
No.	Name	Position	HT/WT	School
24	Nick Weiler	PK	6'/195	North Carolina
84	Eric Keena	P	6'2/175	North Texas

=== West team ===
==== Offense ====
No.	Name	Position	HT/WT	School
1	Elijah McGuire	RB	5'9/205	Louisiana-Lafayette
4	Karel Hamilton	WR	6'1/202	Samford
5	Trey Griffey	WR	6'3/216	Arizona
9	Jalen Robinette	WR	6'4/220	Air Force
10	Gunner Kiel	QB	6'4/225	Cincinnati
11	Zach Terrell	QB	6'2/210	Western Michigan
12	Wes Lunt	QB	6'4/220	Illinois
19	Gabe Marks	WR	6'0/187	Washington State
23	Dare Ogunbowale	RB	5'11/205	Wisconsin
28	Joe Williams	RB	5'11/205	Utah
47	Blake Jarwin	TE	6'5/250	Oklahoma State
48	Taylor McNamara	TE	6'5/255	USC
52	Sam Tevi	OT	6'5/310	Utah
57	Evan Goodman	OT	6'4/300	Arizona State
61	Tobijah Hughley	OC	6'2/295	Louisville
62	Gavin Andrews	OC	6'6/335	Oregon State
65	Avery Gennesy	OT	6'5/315	Texas A&M
66	Zach Johnson	OG	6'4/331	North Dakota State
67	Geoff Gray	OG	6'6/315	Manitoba
73	Chase Roullier	OC	6'4/315	Wyoming
74	Storm Norton	OT	6'8/310	Toledo
77	Victor Salako	OT	6'5/315	Oklahoma State
80	Austin Carr	WR	6'1/200	Northwestern
81	Billy Brown	WR	6'4/245	Shepherd
82	Michael Roberts	TE	6'5/270	Toledo
INJ	Justin Davis	RB	6'1/200	USC
INJ	Sean Harlow	OT	6'4/319	Oregon State
INJ	Jordan Westerkamp	WR	6'0/200	Nebraska

==== Defense ====
No.	Name	Position	HT/WT	School
2	Fabian Moreau	CB	6'0/205	UCLA
3	Randall Goforth	SAF	5'11/190	UCLA
6	Ashton Lampkin	CB	6'0/205	Oklahoma State
7	Tedric Thompson	SAF	6'1/206	Colorado
8	Weston Steelhammer	SAF	6'1/195	Air Force
14	Treston Decoud	CB	6'3/208	Oregon State
15	Aarion Penton	CB	5'10/195	Missouri
18	Jadar Johnson	SAF	6'0/210	Clemson
25	Tyquwan Glass	CB	5'11/194	Fresno State
26	Orion Stewart	SAF	6'0/205	Baylor
31	Kenneth Olugbode	LB	6'1/220	Colorado
32	Leon McQuay III	SAF	6'1/195	USC
33	Kevin Davis	LB	6'2/238	Colorado State
41	Paul Magloire Jr.	LB	6'1/227	Arizona
43	Hardy Nickerson Jr.	LB	6'0/230	Illinois
49	Hunter Dimick	DE	6'3/272	Utah
54	Calvin Munson	LB	6'1/240	San Diego State
55	Josh Tupou	DT	6'3/345	Colorado
75	B. J. Singleton	DT	6'4/310	Houston
90	Avery Moss	DE	6'4/269	Youngstown State
91	Darius English	DE	6'6/245	South Carolina
92	Jimmie Gilbert	LB	6'5/230	Colorado
95	Jeremiah Ledbetter	DE	6'4/278	Arkansas
96	Ralph Green III	DT	6'5/306	Indiana
97	Josh Augusta	DT	6'5/375	Missouri
99	Deatrich Wise Jr.	DE	6'6/270	Arkansas
INJ	Treyvon Hester	DT	6'3/300	Toledo
INJ	Steven Taylor	LB	6'1/225	Houston
INJ	Ahkello Witherspoon	CB	6'3/195	Colorado

==== Specialists ====
No	Name	Position	HT/WT	School
20	Austin Rehkow	P/PK	6'3/200	Idaho

== Game summary ==
=== Scoring summary ===
Scoring summary

Quarter	Time	Drive			Team	Scoring information	Score	
Quarter	Time	Plays	Yards	TOP	Team	Scoring information	East	West
1	6:09	8	38	3:48	West	27-yard field goal by Austin Rehkow	0	3
2	11:44	11	49	6:10	East	21-yard field goal by Nick Weiler	3	3
4	12:38	4	57	2:17	West	Elijah McGuire 18-yard touchdown run, Austin Rehkow kick good	3	10
"TOP" = time of possession. For other American football terms, see Glossary of American football.							3	10

=== Statistics ===
Statistics	East	West
First downs	9	17
Total offense, plays - yards	227	329
Rushes-yards (net)	18-37	28-138
Passing yards (net)	190	191
Passes, Comp-Att-Int	20-35-0	19-30-0
Time of Possession	27:34	32:26

== See also ==
- 2017 NFL draft
