= Trey Hendrickson =

American football player (born 1994)

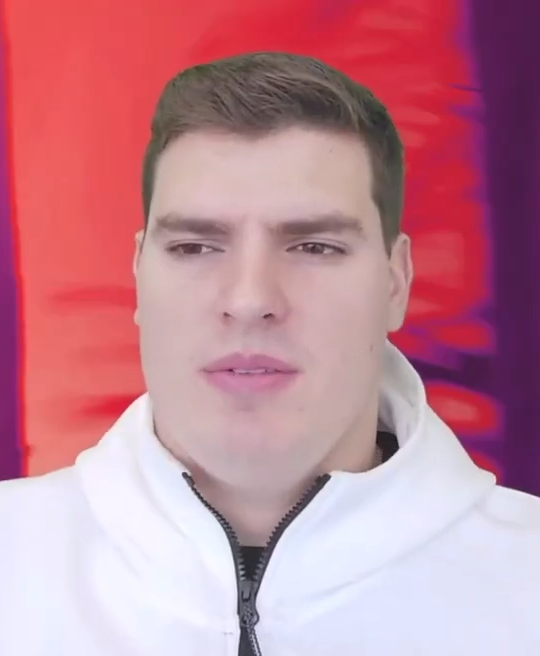
- Hendrickson in 2022

No. 91 – Baltimore Ravens
- Position: Defensive end
- Roster status: Active

Personal information
- Born: December 5, 1994 (age 31); Orlando, Florida, U.S.
- Listed height: 6 ft 4 in (1.93 m)
- Listed weight: 265 lb (120 kg)

Career information
- High school: Apopka (Apopka, Florida)
- College: Florida Atlantic (2013–2016)
- NFL draft: 2017: 3rd round, 103rd overall pick

Career history
- New Orleans Saints (2017–2020); Cincinnati Bengals (2021–2025); Baltimore Ravens (2026–present)

Awards and highlights
- First-team All-Pro (2024); 4× Pro Bowl (2021–2024); Deacon Jones Award (2024); C-USA Defensive Player of the Year (2016)

Career NFL statistics as of Week 10, 2026
- Tackles: 247
- Sacks: 83.0
- Forced fumbles: 15
- Pass deflections: 16
- Stats at Pro Football Reference

Trey Hendrickson (born December 5, 1994) is an American professional football defensive end for the Baltimore Ravens of the National Football League (NFL). He played college football for the Florida Atlantic Owls and was selected by the New Orleans Saints in the third round of the 2017 NFL draft. Hendrickson signed with the Cincinnati Bengals in 2021 and won the 2024 Deacon Jones Award after leading the NFL in sacks that season.

== College career ==
Hendrickson attended Florida Atlantic University in Boca Raton and played college football for the Owls from 2013 to 2016.

== Professional career ==
Hendrickson was projected by the majority of NFL draft experts and scouts to be a third or fourth round pick. He played in the 2017 East-West Shrine Game and was named the game's defensive MVP.

Pre-draft measurables
Height	Weight	Arm length	Hand span	Wingspan	40-yard dash	10-yard split	20-yard split	20-yard shuttle	Three-cone drill	Vertical jump	Broad jump	Bench press
6 ft 4 in (1.93 m)	266 lb (121 kg)	32 in (0.81 m)	9 7/8 in (0.25 m)	6 ft 5 1/8 in (1.96 m)	4.65 s	1.59 s	2.68 s	4.20 s	7.03 s	33.5 in (0.85 m)	10 ft 2 in (3.10 m)	18 reps
All values from NFL Combine/Florida Atlantic's Pro Day

=== New Orleans Saints ===
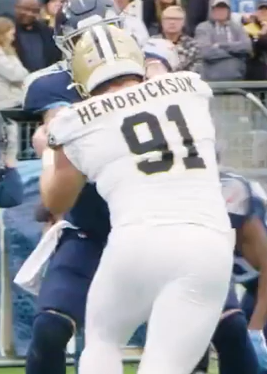
Hendrickson with the New Orleans Saints in 2019

==== 2017 ====
Hendrickson was selected by the New Orleans Saints in the third round (103rd overall) of the 2017 NFL draft. On June 2, 2017, the Saints signed him to a four-year, $3.17 million contract which included a signing bonus of $706,288.

He competed with Darryl Tapp, Alex Okafor, Obum Gwacham, Al-Quadin Muhammad, and Alex Jenkins throughout training camp for the role as the starting defensive end. Head coach Sean Payton named Hendrickson as the backup defensive end to Cameron Jordan and Alex Okafor to begin the regular season.

Hendrickson was unable to appear in the Saints' season-opening 29–19 loss to the Minnesota Vikings due to an illness. On September 17, 2017, Hendrickson made his professional regular season debut against the New England Patriots and recorded three combined tackles in the Saints' 36–20 loss. The next week, he had two combined tackles and sacked Carolina Panthers quarterback Cam Newton during a 34–13 victory. In a Week 6 matchup against the Detroit Lions, he had two pass deflections as the Saints won 52–38.

==== 2018 ====
In the 2018 season, Hendrickson appeared in five games in the regular season and recorded eight combined tackles and four quarterback hits.

==== 2019 ====
In the 2019 regular season opener for the Saints, Hendrickson recorded two sacks against the Houston Texans on Monday Night Football. He had 4.5 sacks, 19 total tackles, and a forced fumble in the 2019 season.

==== 2020 ====
In Week 9 of the 2020 season against the Tampa Bay Buccaneers, Hendrickson recorded two sacks of Tom Brady during the 38–3 win. In Week 15 against the Kansas City Chiefs, Hendrickson sacked Patrick Mahomes twice, including a strip sack that was recovered by the Saints, during a 32–29 loss to Kansas City. Hendrickson finished the 2020 season with 13.5 sacks, 25 total tackles, one pass defended, and a forced fumble. He was ranked 73rd by his fellow players on the NFL Top 100 Players of 2021 and voted to the PFWA All-NFL team.

=== Cincinnati Bengals ===
==== 2021 ====
On March 19, 2021, Hendrickson signed a four-year, $60 million contract with the Cincinnati Bengals. Hendrickson was named the team's starting right defensive end. In Week 2 against the Chicago Bears, Hendrickson recorded his first sack of the season, a strip sack of Bears quarterback Andy Dalton. He had his only multi-sack game of the season in Week 5 against the Green Bay Packers, sacking Aaron Rodgers twice for a loss. That was the first of nine games in a row where Hendrickson recorded a sack, and the first of eleven where he recorded at least half a sack. Hendrickson finished his first season with the team with 14 sacks, breaking the Bengals franchise record for sacks in a single season, and the fifth most in the league for the season.

Hendrickson's dominance continued during the Bengals' playoff run, with a strip sack against Derek Carr in the Bengals' 26–19 win against the Las Vegas Raiders in the NFL Wild Card round. Hendrickson netted another sack in the AFC Championship Game against the Chiefs, leading the Bengals defensive charge on the way to their third Super Bowl appearance in team history. Hendrickson recorded a sack in Super Bowl LVI, with the Bengals losing 23–20 to the Los Angeles Rams.

He was named to his first Pro Bowl, and was ranked 78th by his fellow players on the NFL Top 100 Players of 2022.

==== 2022 ====
Hendrickson returned to playing as the right defensive end. His first breakout performance of the year came in Week 3, where he had four tackles, 2.5 sacks, and two forced fumbles in a 27–12 win over the New York Jets, earning him AFC Defensive Player of the Week. Hendrickson suffered a wrist injury in Week 14 against the Cleveland Browns, leading to him being ruled out the following week against the Tampa Bay Buccaneers. Hendrickson finished the season with eight sacks, 32 total tackles, three passes defended, and three forced fumbles. He was named to his second consecutive Pro Bowl, and was ranked 73rd by his fellow players on the NFL Top 100 Players of 2023.

==== 2023 ====
Hendrickson signed a contract extension through the 2025 season on July 27, 2023. During the Bengals' training camp, Hendrickson was involved in a scuffle with newly signed left tackle Orlando Brown, leading to Hendrickson suffering from superficial wounds. Hendrickson recorded his first sack of the season in Week 1 against the Browns. Hendrickson had his first breakout game of the season in Week 3 against the Rams, sacking Matthew Stafford twice, and recording seven total tackles. In the Bengals' Week 5 matchup against the Arizona Cardinals, Hendrickson had his best single game performance of the season, recording 2.5 sacks, one was a strip sack resulting in a fumble, as well as six tackles in the game. He had a sack in both the Bengals' Week 6 and 8 games, against the Seattle Seahawks and San Francisco 49ers, respectively. Hendrickson also forced a fumble in the latter game against the 49ers.

Hendrickson had a seven-week streak of at least one sack per game, beginning with the Bengals' Week 11 game against the Baltimore Ravens, with a notable moment occurring during the Bengals' Week 15 game against the Vikings, where Hendrickson broke his own record as the Bengals' single-season sack leader, as a sack on Vikings' quarterback Nick Mullens was his 15th sack of the season. Hendrickson's streak ended with the final game of the Bengals' season, only being credited with half a sack. Hendrickson finished the season with 17.5 sacks, again setting the Bengals single-season sack record (previously held by his 2021 total of 14), and a career high 43 tackles. He was tied with Josh Hines-Allen for the second most sacks in NFL for the season, only behind T. J. Watt. Hendrickson was selected to his third consecutive Pro Bowl. He was ranked 77th by his fellow players on the NFL Top 100 Players of 2024 and selected to the PFWA All-NFL team for the second time.

==== 2024 ====
In Week 9 of the 2024 season, against the Las Vegas Raiders, Hendrickson had four sacks in the 41–24 victory, earning AFC Defensive Player of the Week. In Week 18, he recorded 3.5 sacks in a 19–17 win over the Steelers, earning his second Defensive Player of the Week award of the season. He led the league with 17.5 sacks, along with 46 tackles, six passes defensed, and two forced fumbles, and was named first-team All-Pro for 2024. He was ranked 14th by his fellow players on the NFL Top 100 Players of 2025.

==== 2025 ====
After refusing to trade or extend Hendrickson in the 2024 offseason, the Bengals gave him permission to seek a trade in March 2025. Though he was unable to find a trade partner, the Bengals owner, Mike Brown, confirmed the Bengals were still negotiating a contract extension with him and the team had made an offer to him. On July 22, 2025, Hendrickson did not report to the first day of training camp as negotiations continued. His frustrations over the lack of progress in the negotiations escalated to the point that he chose to stay in Florida during his holdout instead of Ohio where training camp was being held. It was reported that a major point of contention between both Hendrickson and the team was the Bengals' extension offer did not have guaranteed money beyond the initial year of the contract. On July 30, Hendrickson reported to camp, but proceeded with a hold-in by withholding from practice and on-field drills. Though he and the Bengals did not come to an agreement on a contract extension, they agreed to a contract restructure that would increase Hendrickson's 2025 salary by $14 million bringing the maximum value to $30 million to end his hold-in on August 25. On December 11, the Bengals placed him on injured reserve due to a hip/pelvis injury which would require surgery.

=== Baltimore Ravens ===
On March 12, 2026, the Baltimore Ravens signed Hendrickson to a four-year, $112 million contract with $60 million guaranteed and a signing bonus of $20 million.

== NFL career statistics ==
Legend
	Led the league
**Bold**	Career high

=== Regular season ===
Year	Team	Games		Tackles					Interceptions					Fumbles			
Year	Team	GP	GS	Cmb	Solo	Ast	Sck	PD	Int	Yds	Avg	Lng	TD	FF	FR	Yds	TD
2017	NO	12	0	13	7	6	2.0	2	0	0	0.0	0	0	1	0	0	0
2018	NO	5	0	8	7	1	0.0	0	0	0	0.0	0	0	0	0	0	0
2019	NO	13	3	19	11	8	4.5	0	0	0	0.0	0	0	1	0	0	0
2020	NO	15	15	25	22	3	13.5	1	0	0	0.0	0	0	1	0	0	0
2021	CIN	16	14	34	21	13	14.0	0	0	0	0.0	0	0	**3**	0	0	0
2022	CIN	15	15	32	22	10	8.0	3	0	0	0.0	0	0	**3**	0	0	0
2023	CIN	17	17	43	28	**15**	**17.5**	3	0	0	0.0	0	0	**3**	0	0	0
2024	CIN	17	17	**46**	**33**	13	**17.5**	**6**	0	0	0.0	0	0	2	0	0	0
2025	CIN	7	7	16	11	5	4.0	1	0	0	0.0	0	0	1	0	0	0
2026	BAL	8	8	11	7	4	2.0	0	0	0	0.0	0	0	0	0	0	0
Career		125	96	247	169	78	83.0	16	0	0	0.0	0	0	15	0	0	0

=== Postseason ===
Year	Team	Games		Tackles					Interceptions					Fumbles			
Year	Team	GP	GS	Cmb	Solo	Ast	Sck	PD	Int	Yds	Avg	Lng	TD	FF	FR	Yds	TD
2017	NO	2	0	4	3	1	0.0	0	0	0	0.0	0	0	0	0	0	0
2018	NO	1	0	0	0	0	0.0	0	0	0	0.0	0	0	0	0	0	0
2019	NO	1	1	5	**5**	0	1.0	**1**	0	0	0.0	0	0	0	0	0	0
2020	NO	1	1	0	0	0	0.0	0	0	0	0.0	0	0	0	0	0	0
2021	CIN	4	4	**8**	**5**	**3**	**3.5**	0	0	0	0.0	0	0	**1**	0	0	0
2022	CIN	3	3	2	1	1	0.0	0	0	0	0.0	0	0	0	0	0	0
Career		12	9	19	14	5	4.5	1	0	0	0.0	0	0	1	0	0	0

== Personal life ==
Hendrickson's father, Collie Hendrickson, played football at Missouri Southern State University in Joplin. Trey Hendrickson majored in criminal justice at Florida Atlantic. He is a Christian.
