= Gavin Andrews =

Australian psychiatrist

- Born: John Gavin Andrews; 6 August 1931 (age 94)
- Awards: Australian Mental Health Prize from the University of New South Wales (2018)
- Scientific career
- Fields: Psychiatry
- Institutions: University of New South Wales

John Gavin Andrews AO (born 6 August 1931) is an Australian academic psychiatrist and Emeritus Professor of Psychiatry at the University of New South Wales in Sydney, Australia. He first joined the faculty of the University of New South Wales in 1964. That same year, he founded the Clinical Research Unit for Anxiety and Depression (CRUfAD), which is jointly run by the University of New South Wales and St Vincent's Hospital, Sydney. He is an ISI Highly Cited Researcher. According to Sarah Berry in the Sydney Morning Herald, Andrews "...was largely responsible for the introduction of cognitive behaviour therapy in Australia, wrote the first set of clinical practice guidelines in psychiatry, and established the National Survey of Mental Health to understand the prevalence of mental illness in the country." He officially retired from the faculty of the University of New South Wales in 2018. Later that year, he was one of two winners of the University of New South Wales' 2018 Australian Mental Health Prize, along with Janne McMahon.
