= Quincy Wilson (cornerback) =

American football player (born 1996)

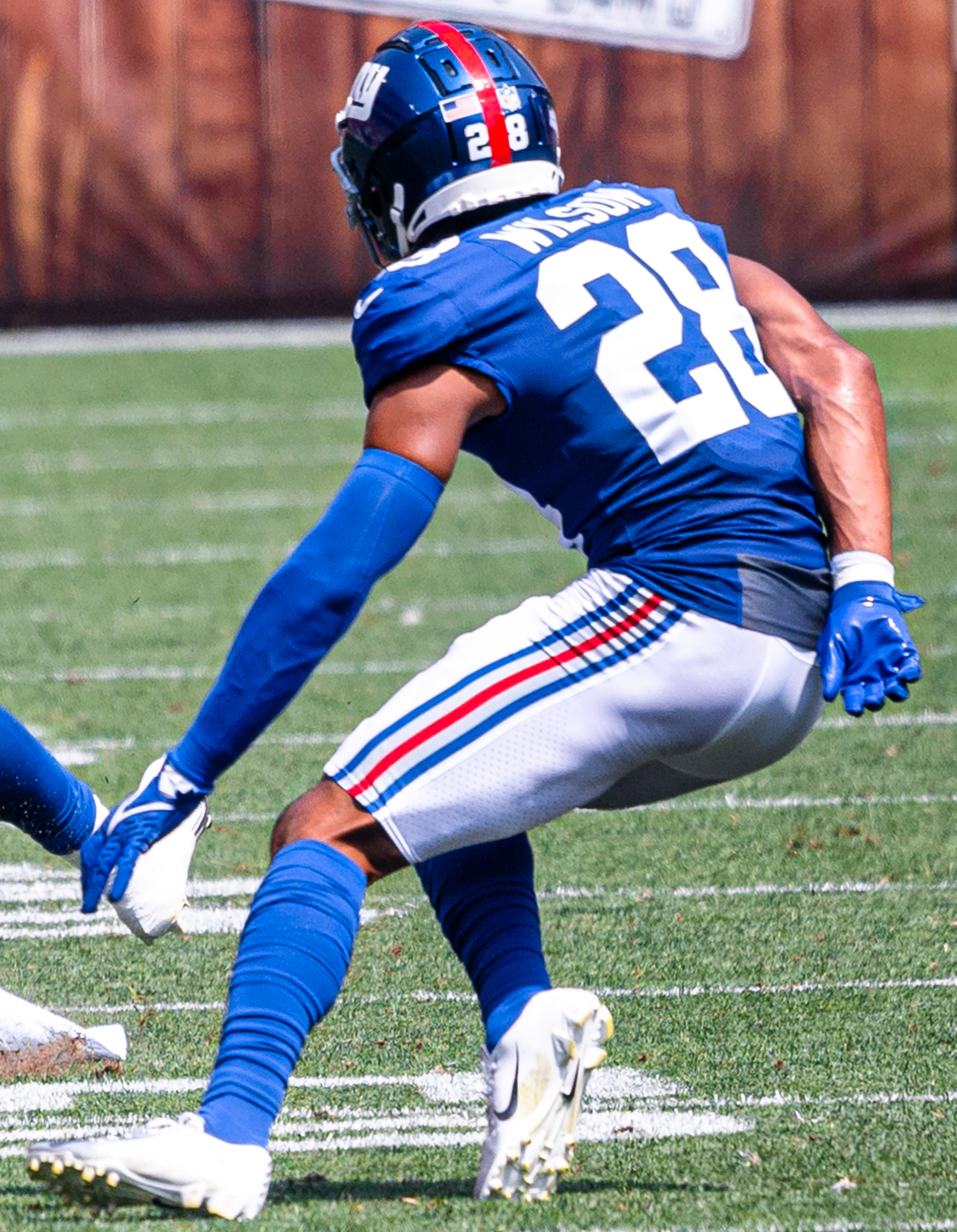
- Wilson with the New York Giants in 2021

Profile
- Position: Cornerback

Personal information
- Born: August 16, 1996 (age 30); Fort Lauderdale, Florida, U.S.
- Listed height: 6 ft 2 in (1.88 m)
- Listed weight: 193 lb (88 kg)

Career information
- High school: NSU University School (Fort Lauderdale, Florida)
- College: Florida (2014–2016)
- NFL draft: 2017: 2nd round, 46th overall pick

Career history
- Indianapolis Colts (2017–2019); New York Jets (2020); New York Giants (2020–2021); Miami Dolphins (2022)*; Pittsburgh Steelers (2022); San Antonio Brahmas (2024)
- * Offseason or practice squad member only

Awards and highlights
- Second-team All-SEC (2016)

Career NFL statistics
- Total tackles: 62
- Fumble recoveries: 1
- Pass deflections: 8
- Interceptions: 2
- Stats at Pro Football Reference

Quincy Wilson (born August 16, 1996) is an American professional football cornerback. He played college football at Florida.

== Early life ==
Wilson attended the University School of Nova Southeastern University in Fort Lauderdale, Florida. During his high school football career, he had 77 tackles and six interceptions. He committed to the University of Florida to play college football.

== College career ==
As a freshman at Florida in 2014, Wilson played in all 12 games and made two starts. He recorded 22 tackles and an interception. As a sophomore in 2015, he played in all 14 games with nine starts and recorded 26 tackles and two interceptions. He returned as a starter his junior year in 2016. As a junior in 2016, Wilson played 13 games with 33 tackles, a sack, three interceptions, and six passes defended. Wilson had one of the quickest rises of any draft prospect in 2016. Prior to 2016, Wilson played a reserve role behind Vernon Hargreaves III, Brian Poole, and Teez Tabor. After the departure of Hargreaves, Wilson displayed great coverage skills and athleticism. In a single season, Wilson went from a largely unknown prospect to a possible first round pick. After the season, Wilson decided to forgo his senior year and enter the 2017 NFL draft.

== Professional career ==
=== Pre-draft ===
Wilson was one of 60 collegiate defensive backs to attend the NFL Scouting Combine in Indianapolis, Indiana. He completed all the combine drills and finished first among all defensive backs in the short shuttle and 14th in the three-cone drill. On March 28, 2017, Wilson attended Florida's pro day, but opted to stand on his combine numbers and only run coverage and receiving drills as scouts and team representatives from 28 NFL teams attended, including New England Patriots' head coach Bill Belichick. Wilson attended private workouts and visits with multiple teams, including the Dallas Cowboys, Philadelphia Eagles, and Cleveland Browns. At the conclusion of the pre-draft process, Wilson was projected to be a second round pick by NFL draft experts and scouts. He was ranked the second best cornerback prospect in the draft by Sports Illustrated, was ranked the sixth best cornerback by ESPN, was ranked the eighth best cornerback by NFLDraftScout.com, and was ranked the ninth best cornerback prospect in the draft by NFL analyst Mike Mayock.

Pre-draft measurables
Height	Weight	Arm length	Hand span	Wingspan	40-yard dash	10-yard split	20-yard split	20-yard shuttle	Three-cone drill	Vertical jump	Broad jump	Bench press
6 ft 1 1/2 in (1.87 m)	211 lb (96 kg)	32 1/4 in (0.82 m)	9 5/8 in (0.24 m)	6 ft 3 5/8 in (1.92 m)	4.54 s	1.58 s	2.65 s	**4.02** s	6.86 s	32 in (0.81 m)	9 ft 10 in (3.00 m)	14 reps
**Bold** denotes Combine top performer All values from NFL Scouting Combine

=== Indianapolis Colts ===
The Indianapolis Colts selected Wilson in the second round (46th overall) of the 2017 NFL draft. He was the eighth cornerback selected and was the first of two cornerbacks the Colts drafted in 2017, ahead of fifth round pick Nate Hairston. On May 11, 2017, the Colts signed Wilson to a four-year, $5.76 million contract that includes $3.06 million guaranteed and a signing bonus of $2.33 million.

Throughout training camp, Wilson competed against veteran journeyman Rashaan Melvin for the job as the No. 2 starting cornerback after it was left vacant by the departure of Patrick Robinson in free agency. Head coach Chuck Pagano named Wilson the third cornerback on the depth chart behind Vontae Davis and Rashaan Melvin.

He made his professional regular season debut in the Colts' season-opener at the Los Angeles Rams and recorded one tackle in their 46–9 loss. The following week, he earned his first career start in place of Vontae Davis, who missed the first three games due to a groin injury. Wilson collected two combined tackles and two pass break ups during a 16–13 loss to the Arizona Cardinals. Wilson aggravated a knee injury he suffered during the preseason before the Colts' Week 3 victory over the Browns. He missed the following ten games (Weeks 3-12). Wilson recovered from his knee injury prior to Week 6, but remained inactive. Head coach Chuck Pagano stated Wilson was a healthy scratch due to his inability to play special teams, but it was speculated this was a minor contributing factor to his absence and when Wilson was asked why he was inactive he stated, "I don't know." Wilson remained a healthy scratch after the Colts released starting cornerback Vontae Davis after Week 9 and finally returned in Week 13 after injuries to Rashaan Melvin and Pierre Desir depleted their options at cornerback. He was named the starting cornerback along with rookie Nate Hairston after Melvin and Desir missed the remaining four games of the regular season. On December 14, 2017, Wilson recorded a season-high eight combined tackles during a 25–13 loss to the Denver Broncos. In Week 17, he started his fourth consecutive game and recorded two solo tackles, a pass deflection, and made his first career interception on quarterback T. J. Yates in the Colts' 22–13 victory against the Houston Texans. He finished his rookie season in 2017 with 22 combined tackles (19 solo), six pass deflections, and an interception in seven games and five starts. The Indianapolis Colts finished third in the AFC South with a 4-12 record and head coach Chuck Pagano was fired after the season.

=== New York Jets ===
On April 25, 2020, Wilson was traded to the New York Jets in exchange for the 211th pick in the 2020 NFL draft. He played in three games before getting waived on November 6.

=== New York Giants ===
On November 17, 2020, Wilson was signed to the practice squad of the New York Giants. He was elevated to the active roster on December 19 for the team's Week 15 game against the Cleveland Browns, and reverted to the practice squad after the game. Wilson signed a reserve/future contract with New York on January 4, 2021. He was placed on injured reserve on August 24. Wilson was released on December 17.

=== Miami Dolphins ===
On January 20, 2022, Wilson signed a reserve/future contract with the Miami Dolphins. He was released by the Dolphins on August 29.

=== Pittsburgh Steelers ===
On September 21, 2022, Wilson was signed to the Pittsburgh Steelers' practice squad. He was released by Pittsburgh on November 22.

=== Houston Roughnecks ===
On December 18, 2023, Wilson was signed by the Houston Roughnecks of the XFL. This iteration of the Roughnecks folded when the Houston Gamblers became the new iteration of the Roughnecks after the XFL and USFL merged to create the United Football League (UFL).

=== San Antonio Brahmas ===
On January 5, 2024, Wilson was drafted by the San Antonio Brahmas during the 2024 UFL dispersal draft. He was placed on injured reserve on March 18. Wilson was waived by the Brahmas on August 23.

== NFL career statistics ==
Year	Team	Games		Tackles				Interceptions						Fumbles	
Year	Team	GP	GS	Cmb	Solo	Ast	Sck	PD	Int	Yds	Avg	Lng	TD	FF	FR
2017	IND	7	5	25	22	3	0.0	6	1	33	33.0	33	0	0	0
2018	IND	13	5	28	20	8	0.0	2	1	0	0.0	0	0	0	1
2019	IND	9	0	11	9	2	0.0	0	0	0	0.0	0	0	0	0
2020	NYJ	3	1	1	1	0	0.0	0	0	0	0.0	0	0	0	0
2020	NYG	0	0	DNP											
2022	PIT	1	0	0	0	0	0.0	0	0	0	0.0	0	0	0	0
Total		33	11	65	52	13	0.0	8	2	33	33.0	33	0	0	1
