= Rashaan Melvin =

American football player (born 1989)

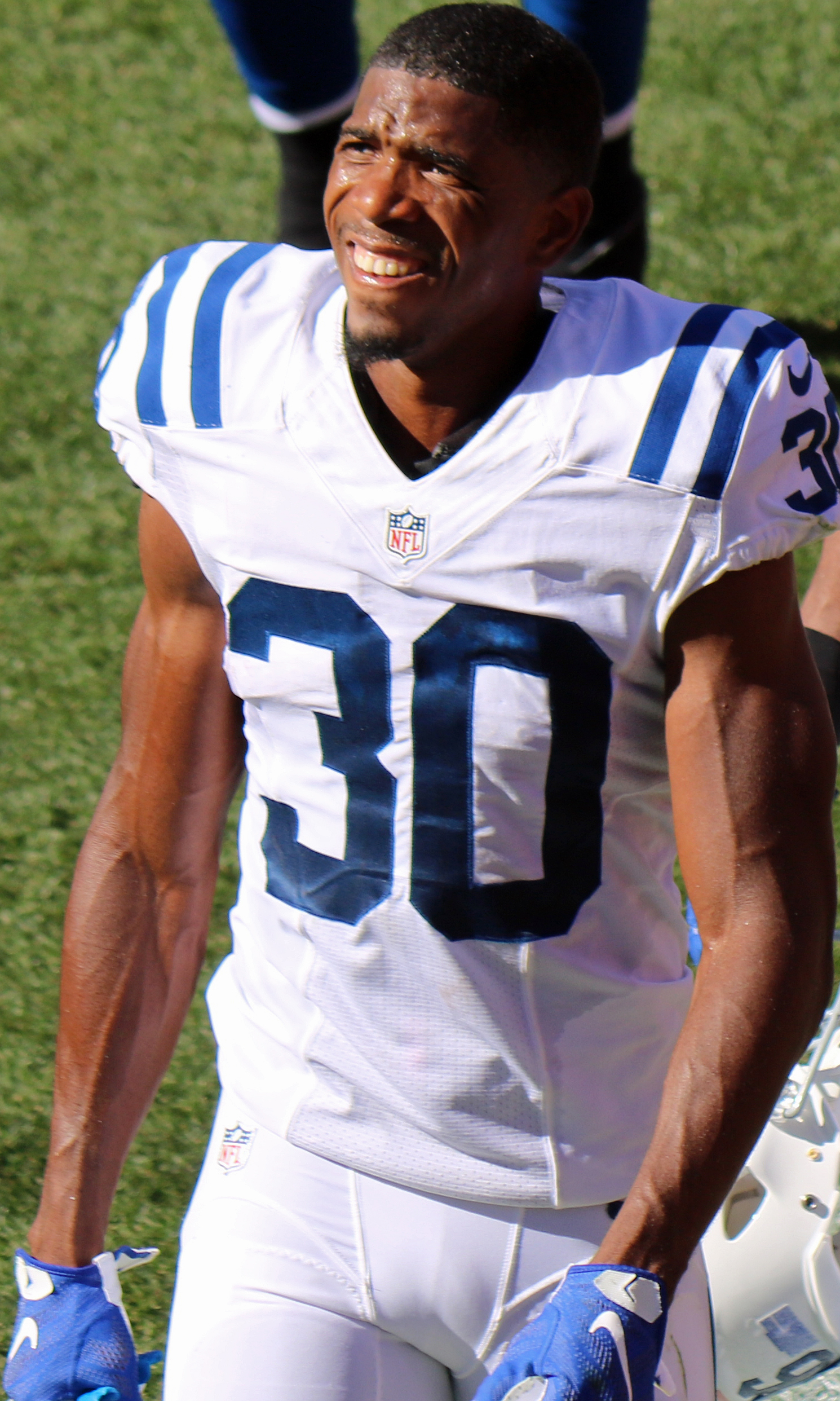
- Melvin with the Indianapolis Colts in 2016

Nebraska Cornhuskers
- Title: Assistant secondary coach

Personal information
- Born: October 2, 1989 (age 37); Waukegan, Illinois, U.S.
- Listed height: 6 ft 2 in (1.88 m)
- Listed weight: 194 lb (88 kg)

Career information
- High school: Waukegan
- College: Northern Illinois (2008–2012)
- NFL draft: 2013: undrafted

Career history

Playing
- Tampa Bay Buccaneers (2013–2014); Miami Dolphins (2014)*; Baltimore Ravens (2014–2015); New England Patriots (2015); Miami Dolphins (2016)*; Indianapolis Colts (2016–2017); Oakland Raiders (2018); Detroit Lions (2019); Jacksonville Jaguars (2020); Carolina Panthers (2021)
- * Offseason or practice squad member only

Coaching
- Nebraska Cornhuskers (2024-present) Assistant secondary coach

Career NFL statistics
- Total tackles: 260
- Forced fumbles: 3
- Fumble recoveries: 1
- Pass deflections: 41
- Interceptions: 4
- Stats at Pro Football Reference

Rashaan DeMarcus Melvin (born October 2, 1989) is an American former professional football cornerback and current assistant secondary coach for the Nebraska Cornhuskers. He played college football for the Northern Illinois Huskies and signed with the Tampa Bay Buccaneers as an undrafted free agent in 2013.

== College career ==
Melvin started 27-of-41 games played at Northern Illinois, totaling 172 tackles (117 solo), six interceptions, 3.5 tackles for loss, one forced fumble and 35 passes defensed. His 35 passes defensed ranked second in school history. He saw action in two games as a walk-on freshman in 2009 and was later awarded a scholarship during the spring of 2010. He saw action in all 14 games (two starts) as a sophomore in 2010, compiling 39 tackles (24 solo), 1.0 tackle for loss, four passes defensed and two interceptions. He started all 13 games as a junior in 2011, recording 78 tackles (54 solo), 1.0 tackle for loss, nine passes defensed and three interceptions. He started all 12 games as a senior, recording 55 tackles (39 solo), 1.5 tackles for loss, 17 passes defensed, one interception and one forced fumble. He led the Mid American Conference and set the single-season school record with 17 passes defensed.

== Professional career ==
=== Pre-draft ===
Melvin did not receive an invitation to the NFL Combine, but performed at Northern Illinois's pro day. At the conclusion of the pre-draft process, Melvin was projected to be a seventh round pick or an undrafted free agent by NFL draft experts and scouts. He was ranked the 36th best cornerback prospect in the draft by DraftScout.com.

Pre-draft measurables
Height	Weight	40-yard dash	10-yard split	20-yard split	20-yard shuttle	Three-cone drill	Vertical jump	Broad jump	Bench press
6 ft 2 in (1.88 m)	192 lb (87 kg)	4.42 s	1.55 s	2.59 s	4.29 s	7.32 s	38 in (0.97 m)	10 ft 6 in (3.20 m)	20 reps
All values from Northern Illinois' Pro Day

=== Tampa Bay Buccaneers ===
==== 2013 ====
On April 29, 2013, the Tampa Bay Buccaneers signed Melvin to a two-year, $900,000 contract that includes a signing bonus of $10,000 as an undrafted free agent after he went undrafted during the 2013 NFL draft. Melvin received a few offers from multiple teams to join as an undrafted free agent, but received the largest signing bonus from the Buccaneers.

Throughout training camp, Melvin competed for a roster spot as a backup cornerback against Anthony Gaitor, Danny Gorrer, Myron Lewis, Branden Smith, and Deveron Carr. On August 29, 2013, Melvin injured his hamstring during the Buccaneers' 30–12 loss to the Washington Redskins in their fourth preseason game. Melvin made the active 53-man roster after an impressive training camp and preseason. Head coach Greg Schiano named Melvin the fourth cornerback on the depth chart to start the regular season, behind Darrelle Revis, Leonard Johnson, and Johnthan Banks.

On October 15, 2013, the Tampa Bay Buccaneers placed Melvin on injured reserve after he missed the first five games due to a hamstring injury. On December 30, 2013, the Tampa Bay Buccaneers fired head coach Greg Schiano and general manager Mark Dominik after they finished with a 4–12 record in 2013.

==== 2014 ====
During training camp in 2014, Melvin competed for a roster spot as a backup cornerback against Mike Jenkins, Danny Gorrer, and Leonard Johnson. Head coach Lovie Smith named Melvin the fifth cornerback on the depth chart to begin the regular season, behind Alterraun Verner, Mike Jenkins, Leonard Johnson, and Johnthan Banks. On September 15, 2014, the Tampa Bay Buccaneers released Melvin.

=== Miami Dolphins (first stint) ===
On October 28, 2014, the Miami Dolphins signed Melvin to their practice squad.

=== Baltimore Ravens ===
==== 2014 ====
On November 8, 2014, the Baltimore Ravens signed Melvin from the Dolphins' practice squad and added him to their active roster after cornerbacks Jimmy Smith, Danny Gorrer, Aaron Ross, and Tramain Jacobs were all placed on injured reserve.

On December 14, 2014, Melvin made his professional regular season debut and recorded five combined tackles and deflected a pass during a 20–12 victory against the Jacksonville Jaguars in Week 15. The following week, Melvin earned his first career start after Asa Jackson sustained an injury to his PCL the previous week. He collected a season-high eight combined tackles and forced a fumble by wide receiver DeAndre Hopkins during the Ravens' 25–13 loss at the Houston Texans in Week 16. He finished the 2014 season with 17 combined tackles (13 solo), a pass deflection, and a forced fumble in three games and two starts.

The Baltimore Ravens finished the 2014 season third in the AFC North with a 10–6 record and earned a wildcard berth. On January 3, 2015, Melvin appeared in his first career playoff game and recorded seven combined tackles in the Ravens' 30–17 victory at the Pittsburgh Steelers in the AFC Wildcard Game. The following week, Melvin made 11 combined tackles (nine solo) during a 35–31 loss at the New England Patriots in the AFC Divisional Round. During the game, Melvin was repeatedly targeted by New England Patriots' quarterback Tom Brady and allowed a total of 12 receptions on 15 targets for 224 yards and two touchdowns, according to Pro Football Focus. Melvin was responsible for the Patriots' 51-yard game-tying touchdown reception by Danny Amendola and the game-winning 23-yard touchdown by Brandon LaFell in the fourth quarter.

==== 2015 ====
On March 9, 2015, the Ravens signed Melvin to a one-year, $585,000 exclusive rights tender. Melvin also underwent surgery on his shoulder during the offseason.

During training camp, Melvin competed for a roster spot as a backup cornerback against Tramain Jacobs, Anthony Levine, Chris Greenwood, Tray Walker, and Cassius Vaughn. Head coach John Harbaugh named Melvin the fourth cornerback on the depth chart to start the season, behind Jimmy Smith, Lardarius Webb, and Kyle Arrington.

Melvin was inactive for the first two regular season games (Weeks 1–2) due to a thigh injury. On September 27, 2015, Melvin made one tackle before being benched in the second quarter after being penalized twice and giving up a 16-yard touchdown reception to wide receiver Marvin Jones during a 28–24 loss to the Cincinnati Bengals. Melvin remained inactive as a healthy scratch for the next two games (Weeks 4–5). On October 13, 2015, the Baltimore Ravens waived Melvin after promoting cornerbacks Asa Jackson and Charles James from the practice squad and signing free agent Shareece Wright.

=== New England Patriots ===
On October 14, 2015, the New England Patriots claimed Melvin off of waivers. Head coach Bill Belichick named Melvin the fifth cornerback on the depth chart upon arriving on the roster, behind Logan Ryan, Malcolm Butler, Justin Coleman, and Brandon King. On November 15, 2015, Melvin collected a season-high three combined tackles in the Patriots' 27–26 victory at the New York Giants in Week 10. On December 8, 2015, the New England Patriots waived Melvin and added him to their practice squad the next day after they signed free agent Leonard Johnson. He finished the 2015 season with nine combined tackles (seven solo) and two tackles on special teams in four games and zero starts.

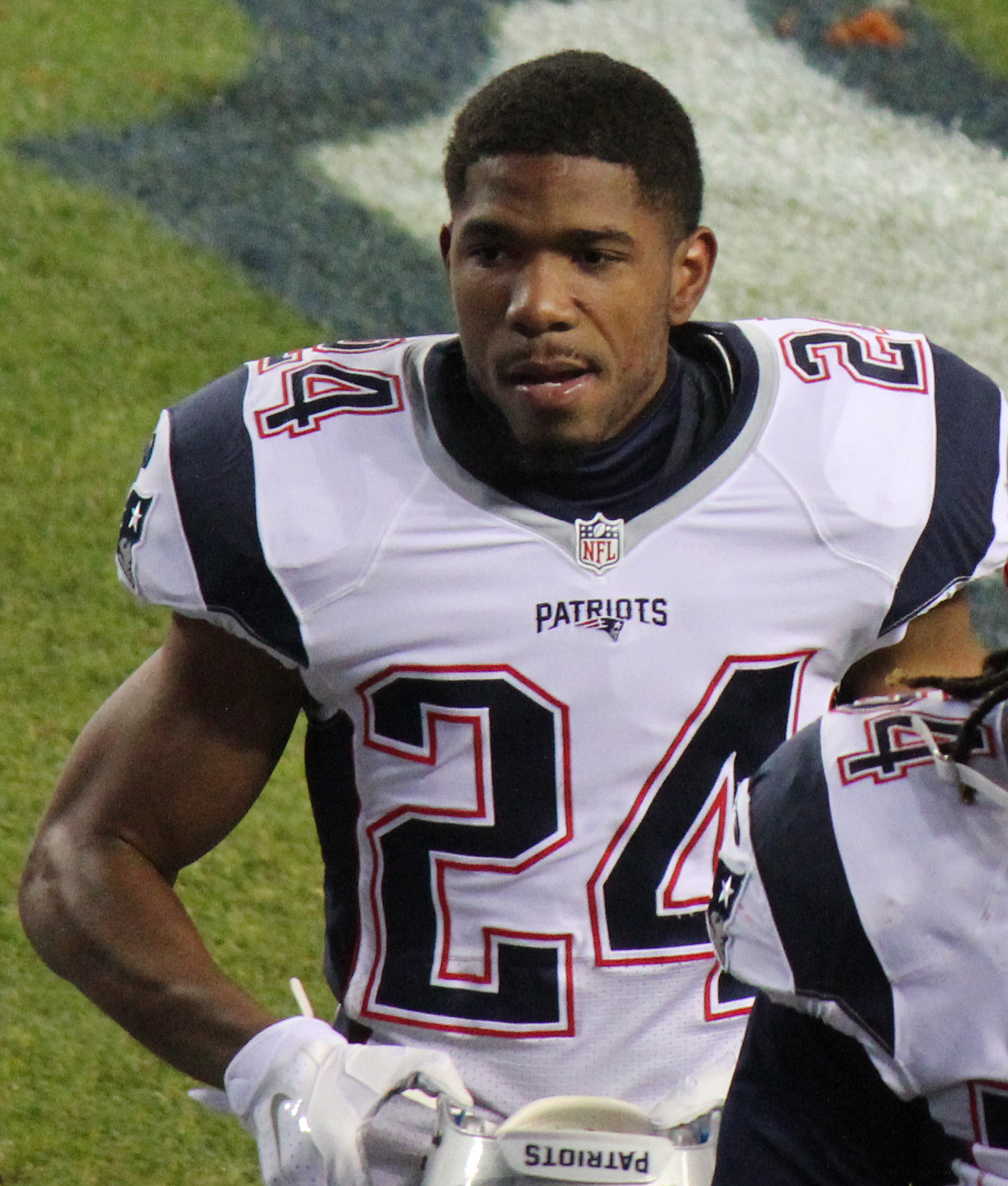
Melvin with the New England Patriots in 2015

On January 26, 2016, Melvin signed a futures contract with the New England Patriots. On May 2, 2016, the New England Patriots released Melvin after drafting cornerback Cyrus Jones in the second round of the 2016 NFL draft.

=== Miami Dolphins (second stint) ===
On July 30, 2016, the Miami Dolphins signed Melvin to a one-year contract. Melvin competed for a roster spot as a backup cornerback during training camp against Tony Lippett, Jordan Lucas, Tyler Patmon, Lafayette Pitts, and Chimdi Chewka. On September 3, 2016, the Miami Dolphins released Melvin as part of their final roster cuts.

=== Indianapolis Colts ===
==== 2016 ====
On September 7, 2016, the Indianapolis Colts signed Melvin to a two-year, $1.45 million contract. Head coach Chuck Pagano named Melvin the sixth cornerback on the Colts' depth chart to start the regular season, behind Vontae Davis, Patrick Robinson, Darius Butler, Antonio Cromartie, and Darryl Morris.

On September 18, 2016, Melvin earned his first start of the season after starting cornerbacks Patrick Robinson and Vontae Davis were inactive due to injuries. Melvin finished the Colts' 34–20 loss at the Denver Broncos with three solo tackles. On November 20, 2016, he collected a season-high 11 solo tackles and two pass deflections during a 28–7 loss to the Pittsburgh Steelers in Week 12. On December 13, 2016, defensive coordinator Ted Monachino officially named Melvin a starting cornerback for the remainder of the season after Patrick Robinson sustained a groin injury and was placed on injured reserve. He was inactive for the Colts' Week 17 loss to the Jacksonville Jaguars due to a knee injury. Melvin finished the 2016 season with 60 combined tackles (42 solo), seven pass deflections, and two forced fumbles in 15 games and nine starts. Melvin received an overall grade of 74.2 from Pro Football Focus in 2016.

==== 2017 ====
Throughout training camp, Melvin competed against rookie Quincy Wilson to be a starting cornerback. Head coach Chuck Pagano named Melvin a starting cornerback to start the regular season in 2017, alongside Vontae Davis.

In Week 2, he collected a season-high seven combined tackles and two pass deflections in the Colts' 16–13 loss to the Arizona Cardinals. On September 24, 2017, Melvin recorded two combined tackles, a season-high four pass deflections, and made his first two interceptions of his career during a 31–28 win against The Cleveland Browns. Melvin made his first career interception off a pass by Browns' quarterback DeShone Kizer, that was originally intended for wide receiver Kasen Williams, and returned it for a seven-yard gain in the third quarter. He suffered a hand injury in Week 12 and missed the next four games. On December 27, 2017, the Indianapolis Colts officially placed Melvin on injured reserve. He finished the 2017 season with 36 combined tackles (30 solo), a career-high 13 passes defensed, and three interceptions in ten games and ten starts. Pro Football Focus gave Melvin an overall grade of 77.9, which ranked 24th among all qualifying cornerbacks in 2017.

=== Oakland Raiders ===
On March 16, 2018, the Oakland Raiders signed Melvin to a one-year, $5.50 million contract with $4.85 million guaranteed and a signing bonus of $3 million.

=== Detroit Lions ===
Melvin signed a one-year, $3.5 million contract with the Detroit Lions on March 22, 2019.

=== Jacksonville Jaguars ===
On April 6, 2020, the Jacksonville Jaguars signed Melvin to a one-year, $2.25 million contract. On August 6, 2020, Melvin announced he would opt out of the 2020 season due to the COVID-19 pandemic. He was released after the season on March 17, 2021.

=== Carolina Panthers ===
On March 18, 2021, the Carolina Panthers signed Melvin to a one-year contract. He was released on August 31, 2021. He re-signed with their practice squad on September 14, 2021. He was promoted to the active roster on September 27.

On March 23, 2022, Melvin re-signed with the Panthers.

Melvin was expected to attend the Panthers' training camp, prior to the start of the 2022-2023 season, but eventually would not attend, due to the cornerback announcing his retirement on July 27, 2022.

Melvin finished his career with 74 games played across nine seasons, having stints with the Ravens, Patriots, Colts, Raiders, Lions and Panthers. His career statistics consisted 258 total tackles, three forced fumbles, four interceptions and 41 pass deflections.

=== Retirement ===
On July 27, 2022, Melvin announced his retirement from professional football.

== NFL career statistics ==
Legend
**Bold**	Career high

=== Regular season ===
Year	Team	Games		Tackles					Interceptions					Fumbles			
Year	Team	GP	GS	Cmb	Solo	Ast	Sck	TFL	Int	Yds	TD	Lng	PD	FF	FR	Yds	TD
2014	BAL	3	2	17	13	4	0.0	**1**	0	0	0	0	1	1	0	0	0
2015	BAL	1	0	1	1	0	0.0	0	0	0	0	0	0	0	0	0	0
2015	NWE	8	0	6	4	2	0.0	0	0	0	0	0	0	0	0	0	0
2016	IND	**15**	9	60	52	8	0.0	**1**	0	0	0	0	7	**2**	**1**	0	0
2017	IND	10	10	36	30	6	0.0	**1**	**3**	**28**	0	**21**	**13**	0	0	0	0
2018	OAK	14	7	56	52	4	0.0	**1**	1	15	0	15	9	0	0	0	0
2019	DET	13	**12**	**68**	**59**	**9**	0.0	0	0	0	0	0	11	0	0	0	0
2021	CAR	10	2	16	12	4	0.0	**1**	0	0	0	0	0	0	0	0	0
Total		74	42	260	223	37	0.0	5	4	43	0	21	41	3	1	0	0

=== Playoffs ===
Year	Team	Games		Tackles					Interceptions					Fumbles			
Year	Team	GP	GS	Cmb	Solo	Ast	Sck	TFL	Int	Yds	TD	Lng	PD	FF	FR	Yds	TD
2014	BAL	**2**	**2**	**18**	**15**	**3**	0.0	0	0	0	0	0	0	0	0	0	0
Total		2	2	18	15	3	0.0	0	0	0	0	0	0	0	0	0	0
