= Vontae Davis =

American football player (1988–2024)

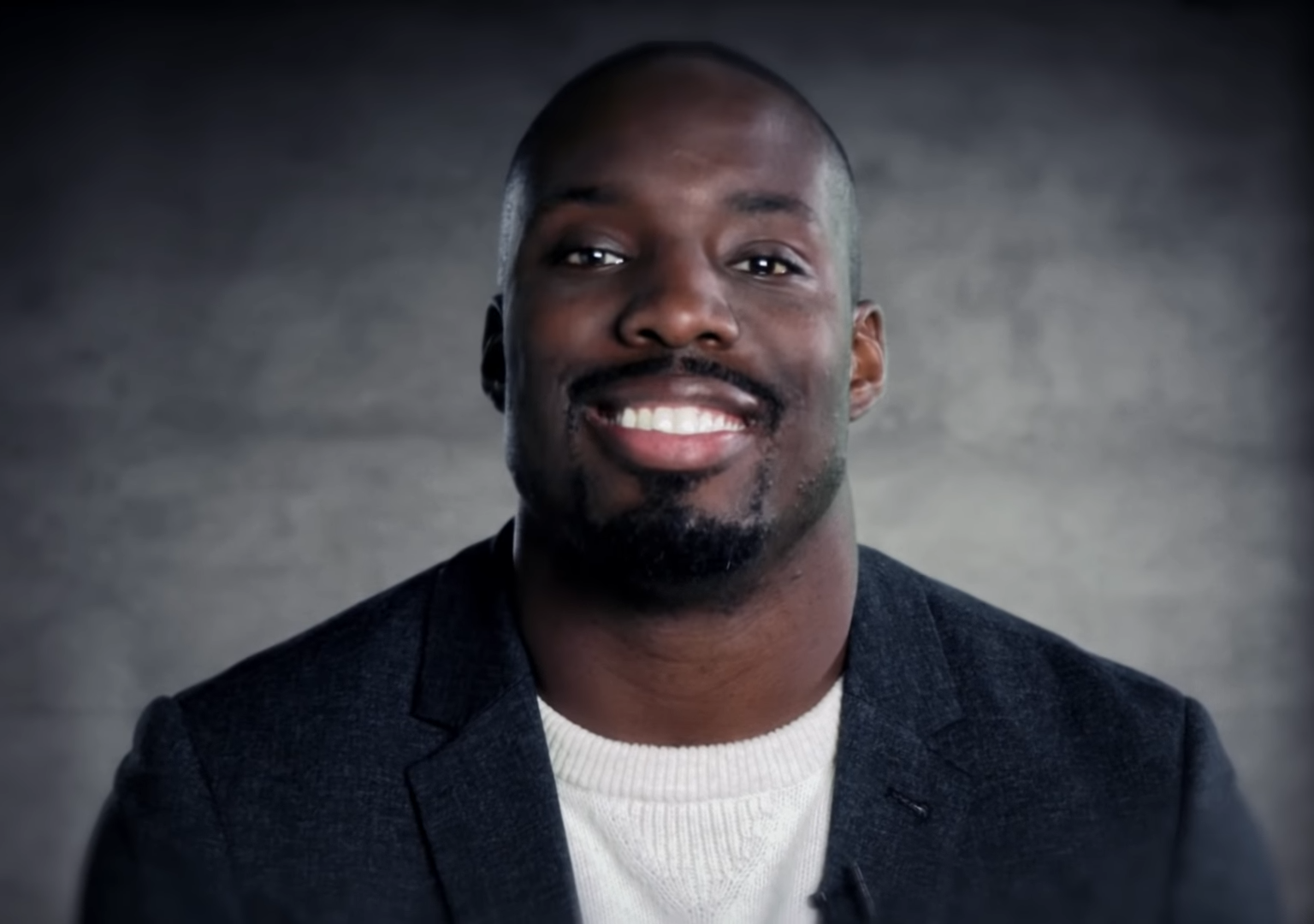
- Davis in 2018

No. 22, 21, 23
- Position: Cornerback

Personal information
- Born: May 27, 1988; Washington, D.C., U.S.
- Died: April 1, 2024 (aged 35); Southwest Ranches, Florida, U.S.
- Listed height: 5 ft 11 in (1.80 m)
- Listed weight: 207 lb (94 kg)

Career information
- High school: Dunbar (Washington, D.C.)
- College: Illinois (2006–2008)
- NFL draft: 2009: 1st round, 25th overall pick

Career history
- Miami Dolphins (2009–2011); Indianapolis Colts (2012–2017); Buffalo Bills (2018)

Awards and highlights
- 2× Pro Bowl (2014, 2015); PFWA All-Rookie Team (2009); 2× First-team All-Big Ten (2007, 2008)

Career NFL statistics
- Games played: 121
- Starts: 113
- Total tackles: 396
- Sacks: 2
- Interceptions: 22
- Forced fumbles: 4
- Touchdowns: 1
- Stats at Pro Football Reference

Vontae Ottis Davis (May 27, 1988 – April 1, 2024) was an American professional football player who was a cornerback in the National Football League (NFL) for 10 seasons. He played college football for the Illinois Fighting Illini and was selected by the Miami Dolphins in the first round of the 2009 NFL draft. Davis also played for the Indianapolis Colts and Buffalo Bills. He made two Pro Bowls in his career.

Davis abruptly retired from the NFL in the middle of the Bills' second game of the 2018 season, removing himself from the game at halftime.

== Early life ==
Davis attended Dunbar High School in Washington, D.C., where he played football and ran track. He played football as a cornerback and wide receiver. During his senior season, he recorded 38 tackles and eight interceptions and achieved many awards and honors including Washington Post first-team All-Metro, PrepStar All-American, DCIAA West first-team All-Conference and D.C. Gatorade Player of the Year.

In track and field, Davis was one of the district's top sprinters. As a senior in 2006, he recorded personal-best times of 10.97 seconds in the 100-meter dash and 22.78 seconds in the 200-meter dash at the DCIAA East/West Championships, placing first in both events.

Considered a three-star recruit by Rivals.com, Davis was ranked as the No. 33 cornerback prospect in the nation.

== College career ==
Davis chose Illinois over Maryland, Michigan State and Virginia. Davis had a great freshman season for the Fighting Illini recording 30 tackles and intercepting one pass. He was named to the Freshman All-America first teams by The Sporting News, Scout.com and Rivals.com and was also the Fighting Illini's Rookie of the Year. In 2007, he started all 12 games he played recording 56 tackles, including 13 in the Rose Bowl against USC and was tied for third in the Big Ten with four interceptions. After his junior season, he declared that he would forgo his senior season and become eligible for the 2009 NFL draft.

== Professional career ==
=== Pre-draft ===
Davis attended the NFL Scouting Combine in Indianapolis, Indiana and completed all of the combine and positional drills. On March 18, 2009, Davis attended Illinois' pro day and opted to perform the majority of combine drills. He posted better times in the 40-yard dash (4.40s), 20-yard dash (2.52s) and 10-yard dash (1.48s) while also adding height to his vertical jump (37.5"). At the conclusion of the pre-draft process, Davis was projected to be a first- or second-round selection by NFL draft experts and scouts. He was ranked the third-best cornerback prospect in the draft by DraftScout.com.

External videos
- Vontae Davis' NFL Combine Workout

Pre-draft measurables
Height	Weight	Arm length	Hand span	40-yard dash	10-yard split	20-yard split	20-yard shuttle	Three-cone drill	Vertical jump	Broad jump	Bench press	Wonderlic
5 ft 11 1/8 in (1.81 m)	203 lb (92 kg)	30 in (0.76 m)	9 1/4 in (0.23 m)	4.40 s	1.48 s	2.52 s	4.07 s	6.75 s	37.5 in (0.95 m)	10 ft 5 in (3.18 m)	25 reps	33
All values from NFL Combine/Pro Day

=== Miami Dolphins ===
==== 2009 ====
The Miami Dolphins selected Davis in the first round of the 2009 NFL draft, using the 25th pick of the draft. Davis was the second cornerback drafted behind Ohio State's Malcolm Jenkins and was the first of two cornerbacks the Dolphins selected in the first two rounds, along with Utah's Sean Smith, whom they drafted in the second round with the 61st overall pick.

External videos
- Dolphins draft Vontae Davis 25th overall

On July 31, 2009, the Dolphins signed Davis to a five-year, $10.25 million contract that includes $7.43 million guaranteed and a signing bonus of $500,000.

Throughout training camp, Davis competed for a job as a starting cornerback against Eric Green and Sean Smith. Head coach Tony Sparano named Davis the fourth cornerback on the Dolphins' depth chart to begin the regular season, behind Will Allen, Sean Smith and Nathan Jones.

Davis made his professional regular-season debut in the Miami Dolphins' season-opener at the Atlanta Falcons and made a solo tackle during their 19–7 loss. Davis recorded his first career regular-season tackle on wide receiver Michael Jenkins for a three-yard loss in the fourth quarter. Davis surpassed Nathan Jones on the depth chart after the Miami Dolphins' Week 3 loss at the San Diego Chargers. On October 4, 2009, Davis recorded three solo tackles, a pass deflection and returned his first career interception for a touchdown during a 38–10 victory against the Buffalo Bills in Week 4. He intercepted a pass attempt by quarterback Trent Edwards that was originally intended for Josh Reed and returned it for a 23-yard touchdown at the end of the second quarter.

On November 1, 2009, Davis earned his first career start in place of Will Allen who was placed on injured reserve after tearing his ACL the previous week. He recorded a season-high seven combined tackles and two pass deflections during their 39–25 victory at the New York Jets in Week 8. The following week, he collected a season-high six solo tackles, broke up two passes and intercepted a pass by Tom Brady during a 27–17 loss at the New England Patriots in Week 9.

He finished his rookie season in 2009 with 51 combined tackles (47 solo), 11 pass deflections and four interceptions in 16 games and nine starts. Davis led the team in interceptions as a rookie and led all defensive backs on the team in tackles. Pro Football Weekly selected Davis on its annual All-Rookie team.

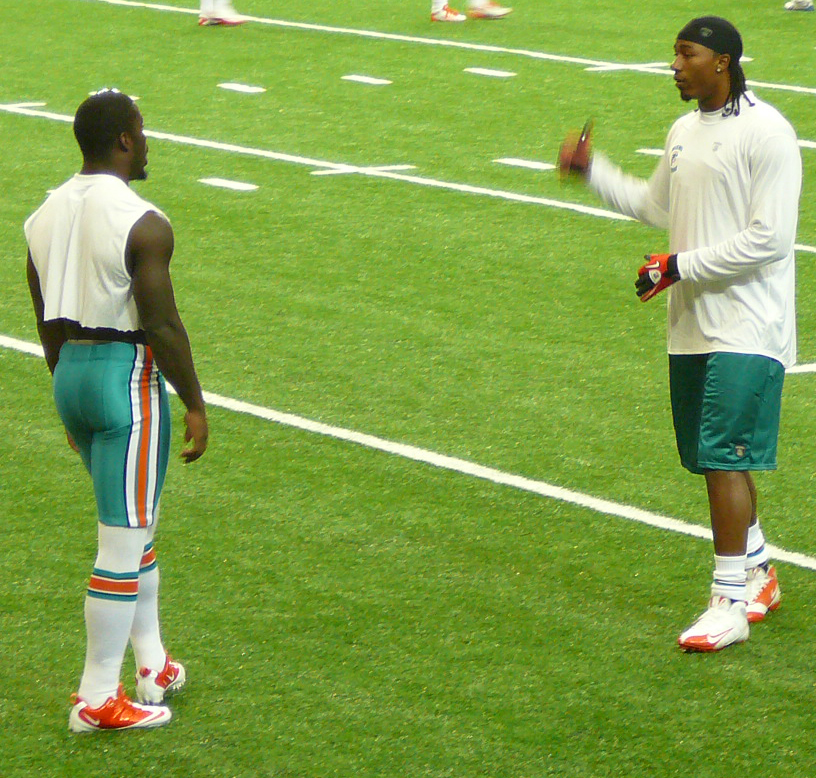
Davis (left) with fellow Dolphins' cornerback Sean Smith in 2011

==== 2010 ====
Davis entered training camp slated as the No. 1 starting cornerback on the depth chart. Head coach Tony Sparano officially named Davis the starting cornerback to start the regular season, alongside Jason Allen and nickelback Nolan Carroll.

Davis started in the Miami Dolphins' season-opener at the Buffalo Bills and made two solo tackles and deflected a pass in their 15–10 victory. In Week 2, Davis collected six solo tackles, two pass deflections and intercepted a pass by Brett Favre during a 14–10 victory at the Minnesota Vikings. After the game, Vikings' quarterback Brett Favre stated, "Number 21, I felt like, was one of the best corners in this league, especially that no one knows about." On November 7, 2010, Davis collected a season-high seven combined tackles and a pass deflection in the Dolphins' 27–10 loss at the Baltimore Ravens in Week 9. Davis completed the 2010 season with 54 combined tackles (46 solo), 12 pass deflections and an interception in 16 games and 15 starts.

==== 2011 ====
Defensive coordinator Mike Nolan retained Davis as a starting cornerback, along with Sean Smith, to start the season. Davis started in the Miami Dolphins' season-opener against the New England Patriots and recorded four combined tackles before exiting the 38–24 loss due to cramps. The following week, he collected six solo tackles in the Dolphins' 23–13 loss to the Houston Texans in Week 2. He exited in the third quarter due to a hamstring injury and was inactive for the next two games (Weeks 3–4). In Week 14, he made four solo tackles, broke up a pass and made his first career sack on quarterback Carson Palmer as the Dolphins defeated Oakland 34–14. On December 13, 2011, the Miami Dolphins fired head coach Tony Sparano after falling to a 4–9 record. Defensive backs coach Todd Bowles was named the interim head coach for the last three games. On December 18, 2011, Davis recorded five combined tackles, two pass deflections and intercepted two passes by Ryan Fitzpatrick in the Dolphins' 30–23 win at the Buffalo Bills in Week 15. The interceptions marked his first career multi-interception game. He finished the 2011 season with 43 combined tackles (39 solo), nine pass deflections, four interceptions and a sack in 12 games and 12 starts.

==== 2012 ====
Davis entered training camp slated as a starting cornerback, along with Sean Smith, but saw competition from Richard Marshall and Nolan Carroll. During camp, he was surpassed on the depth chart by Marshall and was demoted to being the third cornerback on the depth chart. Following his demotion, he competed to be the first-team nickelback against Nolan Carroll.

=== Indianapolis Colts ===
==== 2012 ====
On August 26, 2012, the Dolphins traded Davis to the Indianapolis Colts in exchange for their second-round pick (54th overall) and a conditional sixth-round pick in the 2013 NFL draft. The Miami Dolphins used the second-round pick they received in the trade to draft cornerback Jamar Taylor, but did not receive a conditional sixth-round pick after Davis did not exceed more than 65% of the Colts' defensive snaps in 2012.

Head coach Chuck Pagano named Davis a starting cornerback to begin the regular season, along with Jerraud Powers. He made his Indianapolis Colts regular-season debut in their season-opener at the Chicago Bears and recorded five solo tackles in their 41–21 loss. Davis was inactive for two games (Weeks 5–6) due to an ankle injury he sustained in Week 3. On October 28, 2012, Davis made one tackle before exiting the Colts' 19–13 victory at the Tennessee Titans in the first quarter after injuring his knee. His injury sidelined him for the next four games (Weeks 9–12). In Week 14, he collected eight combined tackles, broke up a pass and sacked quarterback Jake Locker during a 27–23 win at the Tennessee Titans. The following week, Davis collected a season-high nine solo tackles during a 29–17 loss at the Houston Texans in Week 15. On December 30, 2012, Davis recorded five solo tackles, three pass deflections and intercepted two passes by Matt Schaub during a 28–16 win in Week 17. He finished the season with 51 combined tackles (46 solo), seven passes defensed, three interceptions and a sack in ten games and ten starts.

The Indianapolis Colts finished second in the AFC South with an 11–5 record and clinched a wildcard berth. On January 6, 2013, Davis started his first career playoff game as the Colts lost 24–9 to the eventual Super Bowl champions, Baltimore Ravens, in the AFC Wildcard Game.

==== 2013 ====
Defensive coordinator Greg Manusky retained Davis as the No. 1 starting cornerback to begin the season, along with Greg Toler and nickelback Darius Butler. In Week 4, Davis had a season-high two pass deflections, three solo tackles and made an interception during their 37–3 victory at the Jacksonville Jaguars. On October 14, 2013, he collected a season-high seven combined tackles in the Colts' 19–9 loss at the San Diego Chargers in Week 6. He finished the 2013 season with 46 combined tackles (41 solo), 12 pass deflections and an interception in 16 games and 16 starts.

The Indianapolis Colts finished atop their division with an 11–5 record. On January 4, 2014, Davis started in the AFC Wildcard Game and recorded three combined tackles during a 45–44 victory against the Kansas City Chiefs. The following week, he made one tackle in the Colts' 43–22 loss at the New England Patriots in the AFC Divisional Round. Davis earned an overall grade of 86.0 from Pro Football Focus, which was the sixth-highest grade among all qualifying cornerbacks in 2013.

==== 2014 ====
On March 11, 2014, the Indianapolis Colts signed Davis to a four-year, $39 million contract with $20 million guaranteed.

Davis and Greg Toler returned as the Colts' starting cornerback duo to begin the 2014 regular season. On October 9, 2014, Davis collected a season-high five combined tackles and a pass deflection during a 33–28 victory at the Houston Texans in Week 6. In Week 12, he made two solo tackles, two pass deflections and returned an interception for 42 yards in the Colts' 23–3 win against the Jacksonville Jaguars. The following week, Davis recorded two combined tackles and two pass deflections before leaving the Colts' 49–27 victory against the Washington Redskins in the second quarter after sustaining a concussion. He received the concussion while attempting to tackle running back Roy Helu and remained on the ground for several minutes before walking off the field on his own. He remained in the Colts' concussion protocol and was inactive for their Week 14 victory at the Cleveland Browns. On December 23, 2014, it was announced that Davis was selected to the 2015 Pro Bowl. Davis completed the 2014 season with 42 combined tackles (35 solo), a career-high 18 pass deflections and four interceptions in 15 games and 15 starts. He also led the NFL in lowest opposing passer rating (38.8) and earned an overall grade of 95.1, which was the second-highest overall grade among all qualifying cornerbacks in 2014.

The Indianapolis Colts finished first in the AFC South with an 11–5 record and reached the AFC Championship before being defeated 45–7 by the New England Patriots who eventually won Super Bowl XLIX. During the AFC Divisional Round, Davis recorded eight combined tackles and a career-high five pass deflections in the Colts' 24–13 victory at the Denver Broncos.

==== 2015 ====
On October 25, 2015, Davis collected a season-high six combined tackles, two pass deflections and an interception during a 27–21 loss to the New Orleans Saints in Week 7. The following week, Davis collected two solo tackles, two pass deflections and intercepted a pass by Cam Newton in the Colts' 29–26 loss at the Carolina Panthers in Week 8. He finished the season with 48 combined tackles (38 solo), 16 pass deflections and four interceptions in 16 games and 16 starts. On January 25, 2016, Davis was selected to the 2016 Pro Bowl as a replacement for Chris Harris Jr. who was playing in Super Bowl 50 as a member of the Denver Broncos. He received an overall grade of 86.9 from Pro Football Focus and ranked third among all qualifying cornerbacks in 2015.

==== 2016 ====
On January 5, 2016, the Indianapolis Colts fired defensive coordinator Greg Manusky after they finished with an 8–8 record in 2015. Defensive coordinator Ted Monachino retained Davis as the No. 1 starting cornerback to start the season, along with Patrick Robinson. Davis was sidelined for the first two games of the regular season after spraining his ankle in the Colts' first preseason game. On October 16, 2016, Davis recorded a season-high five combined tackles, two pass deflections and an interception during a 26–23 loss at the Houston Texans in Week 6. In Week 16, he made a season-high five solo tackles and broke up a pass in the Colts' 33–25 loss at the Oakland Raiders. He finished the 2016 season with 37 combined tackles (34 solo), ten pass deflections and an interception in 14 games and 14 starts. Pro Football Focus gave Davis an overall grade of 47.3 in 2016.

==== 2017 ====
Davis entered training camp slated as a starting cornerback along with Rashaan Melvin. He sustained a groin injury during the preseason and was sidelined for the first three games of the regular season (Weeks 1–3). On October 1, 2017, he started in his first game of the season and collected a season-high six solo tackles in the Colts' 46–18 loss at the Seattle Seahawks in Week 4.

On October 29, 2017, Davis collected four combined tackles and a pass deflection during a 24–23 loss at the Cincinnati Bengals in Week 8. Prior to the game, it was reported that the Indianapolis Colts received inquiries from two teams about possibly trading for Davis. Head coach Chuck Pagano benched Davis in favor of rookie Quincy Wilson during the Colts' Week 9 victory against the Houston Texans in what he called a non-injury related coaching decision. Davis voiced his displeasure and stated he felt disrespected after the Colts did not allow him to travel with the team to Houston. This account was disputed by Indianapolis Star columnist Gregg Doyel, who claimed the precipitating factor in not allowing Davis to travel with the team was actually a heated argument with head coach Chuck Pagano over his benching for poor play, a decision which was relayed to the cornerback by assistant coaches, causing Davis to take umbrage.

On November 8, 2017, it was reported that Davis decided to have surgery to repair a lingering groin injury he sustained during the preseason, which would take him out of play for the remainder of the season. On November 9, 2017, the Indianapolis Colts released Davis, ending a six-year tenure with the team. Davis finished his truncated 2017 season with 21 combined tackles (16 solo) and two pass deflections in five games and five starts. Pro Football Focus gave Davis an overall grade of 45.2, which ranked 103rd among all qualifying cornerbacks in 2017.

=== Buffalo Bills ===
On February 26, 2018, Davis signed a one-year deal with the Buffalo Bills worth up to $5 million, with $3.5 million guaranteed.

Davis was a healthy scratch during the team's Week 1 game against the Baltimore Ravens—a pregame decision regarded by Buffalo News beat-writer Jay Skurski as "mildly surprising." This proved a precursor to drama in Week 2, when in the middle of the September 16 contest with the Los Angeles Chargers, in which he had given up a touchdown to Mike Williams, Davis removed himself from the game, stating he was "done".

According to a statement made by head coach Sean McDermott, it was not immediately clear whether he meant to retire or simply leave that particular game. Following the game, Davis released a statement confirming his retirement. "This isn't how I pictured retiring from the NFL," Davis said, "but today on the field, reality hit me and hard. I shouldn't be out there anymore."

Davis' decision was not taken well by his teammates and later lampooned in the media. Davis later commented that his abrupt retirement was due to the sudden realization that football was no longer what he was meant to be doing and that "leaving was therapeutic".

== Career statistics ==
=== NFL ===
Year	Team	Games		Tackles					Interceptions						Fumbles		
Year	Team	GP	GS	Cmb	Solo	Ast	Sck	Sfty	PD	Int	Yds	Avg	Lng	TD	FF	FR	Yds
2009	MIA	16	9	52	48	4	0.0	0	11	4	64	16.0	26	1	0	0	0
2010	MIA	16	15	54	46	8	0.0	0	12	1	0	0.0	0	0	1	0	0
2011	MIA	12	12	43	39	4	1.0	0	9	4	60	15.0	28	0	0	0	0
2012	IND	10	10	51	46	5	1.0	0	7	3	26	8.7	26	0	0	0	0
2013	IND	16	16	46	41	5	0.0	0	12	1	0	0.0	0	0	0	0	0
2014	IND	15	15	42	35	7	0.0	0	19	4	72	18.0	42	0	2	1	−9
2015	IND	16	16	48	38	10	0.0	0	16	4	6	1.5	6	0	0	0	0
2016	IND	14	14	37	34	3	0.0	0	10	1	0	0.0	0	0	0	0	0
2017	IND	5	5	21	16	5	0.0	0	2	0	0	0.0	0	0	0	0	0
2018	BUF	1	1	1	1	0	0.0	0	0	0	0	0.0	0	0	0	0	0
Total		121	113	395	344	51	2.0	0	98	22	228	10.4	42	1	3	1	-9

=== College ===
Season	Team	Class	Pos	GP	Tackles					Interceptions				
Season	Team	Class	Pos	GP	Solo	Ast	Cmb	TfL	Sck	Int	Yds	Avg	TD	PD
2006	Illinois	FR	CB	12	30	22	52	2.5	0.0	1	0	0.0	0	0
2007	Illinois	SO	CB	12	56	20	76	4.0	0.0	4	0	0.0	0	0
2008	Illinois	JR	CB	12	53	25	78	7.0	0.0	2	12	6.0	0	0
Career				36	139	67	206	13.5	0.0	7	12	1.7	0	0

== Personal life ==
Vontae was the younger brother of former San Francisco 49ers, Denver Broncos, and Washington Redskins tight end Vernon Davis. In June 2009, several media outlets incorrectly reported that Davis was stopped and arrested for traffic infractions in Champaign, Illinois. The incident turned out to be the result of identity theft after Davis's wallet was stolen. In June 2015, Davis married his girlfriend Megan Harpe. From September 2019 until his death, Davis was CEO of a holistic wellness spa that opened the following October in Fort Lauderdale, Florida.

Davis' cousin, Jaden Davis, plays in the NFL for the Arizona Cardinals.

== Death ==
On April 1, 2024, Davis was found dead by his personal assistant in his home gym in Southwest Ranches, Florida. He was 35. On April 12, 2025, a year after his death, the medical examiner's office reported that the cause of death was "undetermined" with "signs of blunt force trauma, hemorrhage and drug overdose." The report noted some evidence of injury, including an abrasion near his right eye and a small hemorrhage. Police also found drugs, such as amphetamines, methamphetamines and cannabis in his system following his death; along with a "spoon with signs of burn markings on the bottom" at the scene. Davis' brother also stated he believed the cause of death was due to something Davis "introduced into his body", further indicating the death could have been a drug overdose or possible suicide.
