= Erik Swoope =

American football player (born 1992)

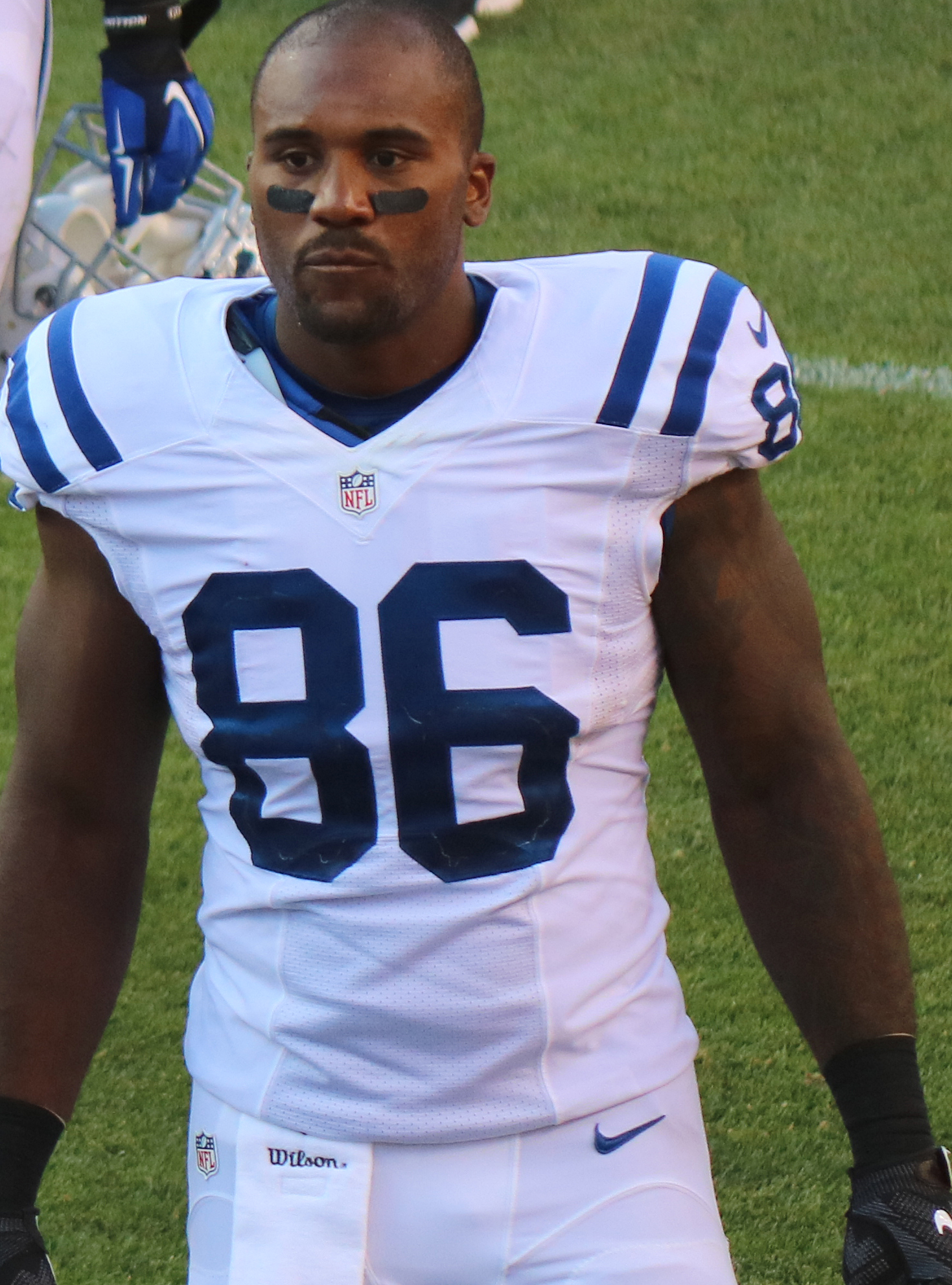
- Swoope with the Indianapolis Colts in 2016

No. 86
- Position: Tight end

Personal information
- Born: May 8, 1992 (age 34); Lake Elsinore, California, U.S.
- Listed height: 6 ft 5 in (1.96 m)
- Listed weight: 257 lb (117 kg)

Career information
- High school: Harvard-Westlake School (Los Angeles, California)
- College: Miami (FL) (basketball)
- NFL draft: 2014: undrafted

Career history
- Indianapolis Colts (2014–2018); New Orleans Saints (2018); Indianapolis Colts (2018)*; Oakland Raiders (2019)*; San Francisco 49ers (2020)*
- * Offseason or practice squad member only

Career NFL statistics
- Receptions: 23
- Receiving yards: 384
- Receiving average: 16.7
- Receiving touchdowns: 4
- Stats at Pro Football Reference

Erik Swoope (born May 8, 1992) is an American former professional football player who was a tight end in the National Football League (NFL). He played college basketball at the University of Miami. Despite never having played organized football, he was signed by the Indianapolis Colts as an undrafted free agent after the 2014 NFL draft.

== Early life ==
Swoope attended Harvard-Westlake High School and played on the basketball team. As a senior, he averaged 21.8 points, 8.9 rebounds, 1.6 assists, and 1.5 blocks per game, as well as 2.8 steals as well as 71% free throw percentage. He recorded 16 games of 20-or-more points, including eight with 30-or-more points. He scored 10-or-more points in all but two games that season. He also recorded 12 double-doubles, including one 30-point, 21-rebound game. He recorded a season high 40 points on 14-17 shooting, including shooting 12-of-13 free throws.

He was also named the Mission League Most Valuable Player (MVP). The Los Angeles Daily News called him the "most dominant boys' basketball player" in the San Fernando Valley. He was rated the 41st overall power forward by ESPN.

== College basketball career ==
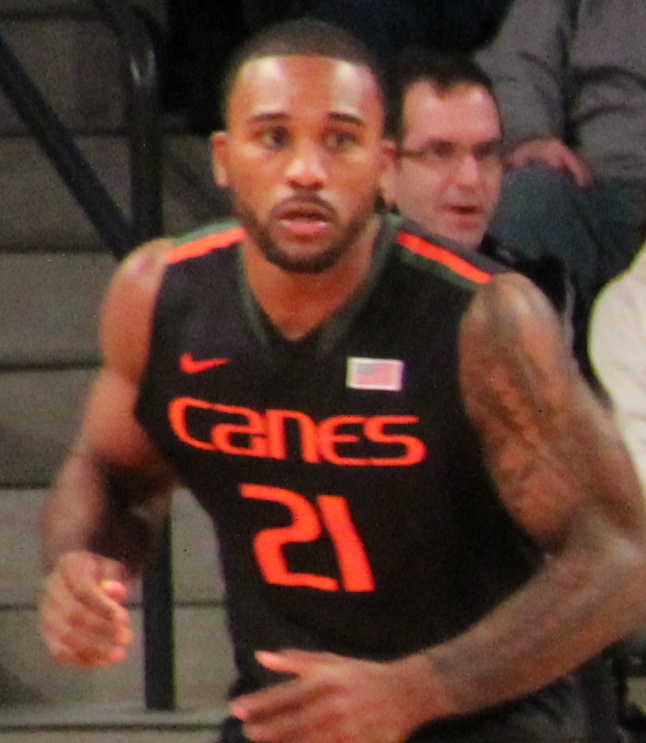
Swoope playing basketball at the University of Miami, 2013

Swoope attended the University of Miami, where he majored in economics.

As a freshman during the 2010–11 season, he appeared in 29 games (nine starts) as a true freshman. He averaged 1.4 points and one rebound in 6.5 minutes per game. He was named to the 2011 ACC All-Academic Basketball team. As a sophomore in the 2011–12 season, he appeared in 23 games (eight starts). He averaged 2.3 points and 1.7 rebounds in 11.7 minutes per game, while shooting 50% (23-of-46) from the field and 47.1% free throw percentage.

As a junior during the 2012–13 season, he appeared in 27 games. He averaged 1.6 points and 1.2 rebounds per game, while shooting 18-of-28 (64.3%) from the field. As a senior in the 2013–14 season, he appeared in 31 games (10 starts). He averaged five points, 2.7 rebounds, 0.5 assists, 0.4 steals, 0.4 blocks and 18.4 minutes per game.

For his career, he appeared in 110 games (27 starts). He averaged 2.6 points, 1.7 rebounds, 0.3 steals, 0.3 assists, 0.3 blocks in 10.8 minutes per game.

== Professional football career ==
Pre-draft measurables
Height	Weight
6 ft 4 3/4 in (1.95 m)	224 lb (102 kg)
Values from Pro Day

=== Indianapolis Colts ===
After going undrafted in the 2014 NFL draft, Swoope signed with the Indianapolis Colts on May 11, 2014. and was waived on August 30. The Colts then signed Swoope to their practice squad on September 1, and on January 19, 2015, he signed a reserve/future contract to remain with the Colts. Swoope was waived by the Colts on September 5, and signed to the practice squad the next day. On December 30, 2015, Swoope was elevated to the active roster for the first time, after Dwayne Allen was placed on injured reserve.

Swoope started his first career game against the Denver Broncos during Week 2 of the 2016 season. Swoope caught his first career touchdown in a 34–6 win over the Minnesota Vikings in Week 15.

On September 4, 2017, Swoope was placed on injured reserve after undergoing minor knee surgery in August 2017.

On September 13, 2018, Swoope was waived by the Colts and was signed to the practice squad the next day. He was promoted back to the active roster on September 22, 2018. He was waived again on September 28, 2018 and re-signed to the practice squad. He was promoted back to the active roster on October 3, 2018. One day later, he scored his first touchdown since the 2016 season against the New England Patriots in a 38–24 loss on Thursday Night Football. On December 11, 2018, Swoope was waived by the Colts.

=== New Orleans Saints ===
On December 12, 2018, Swoope was claimed off waivers by the New Orleans Saints, only to be waived the next day after failing his physical.

=== Indianapolis Colts (second stint) ===
On December 26, 2018, Swoope was signed to the Indianapolis Colts practice squad.

=== Oakland Raiders ===
On May 21, 2019, Swoope signed with the Oakland Raiders. He was waived on July 30, 2019.

=== San Francisco 49ers ===
Swoope had a tryout with the San Francisco 49ers on August 23, 2020, and signed with the team two days later. He was waived on August 29.

== Career statistics ==
=== NFL ===
Season	Team	Games		Receiving					Rushing					Fumbles	
Season	Team	GP	GS	Rec	Yds	Avg	Lng	TD	Att	Yds	Avg	Lng	TD	FUM	Lost
2015	IND	1	0	—	—	—	—	—	—	—	—	—	—	—	—
2016	IND	16	4	15	297	19.8	45	1	—	—	—	—	—	—	—
2018	IND	7	2	8	87	10.9	26	3	—	—	—	—	—	—	—
Career		24	6	23	384	16.7	45	4	—	—	—	—	—	—	—

=== College basketball ===
Year	Team	GP	GS	MPG	FG%	3P%	FT%	RPG	APG	SPG	BPG	PPG
2010–11	Miami	29	9	6.5	.440	.000	.600	1.0	.1	.4	.06	1.4
2011–12	Miami	23	8	11.7	.500	.000	.471	1.7	.3	.4	.4	2.3
2012–13	Miami	27	0	6.0	.643	1.000	.316	1.2	.1	.1	.07	1.6
2013–14	Miami	31	10	18.4	.514	.143	.672	2.7	.5	0.3	.3	5.0
Career Archived March 22, 2016, at the Wayback Machine		110	27	10.8	.519	.200	.577	1.7	.3	.3	.2	2.6

== Personal life ==
Swoope is the son of Denise and Gerald Swoope. He has a brother named Devin Swoope.
