= Jordan Wilkins =

American football player (born 1994)

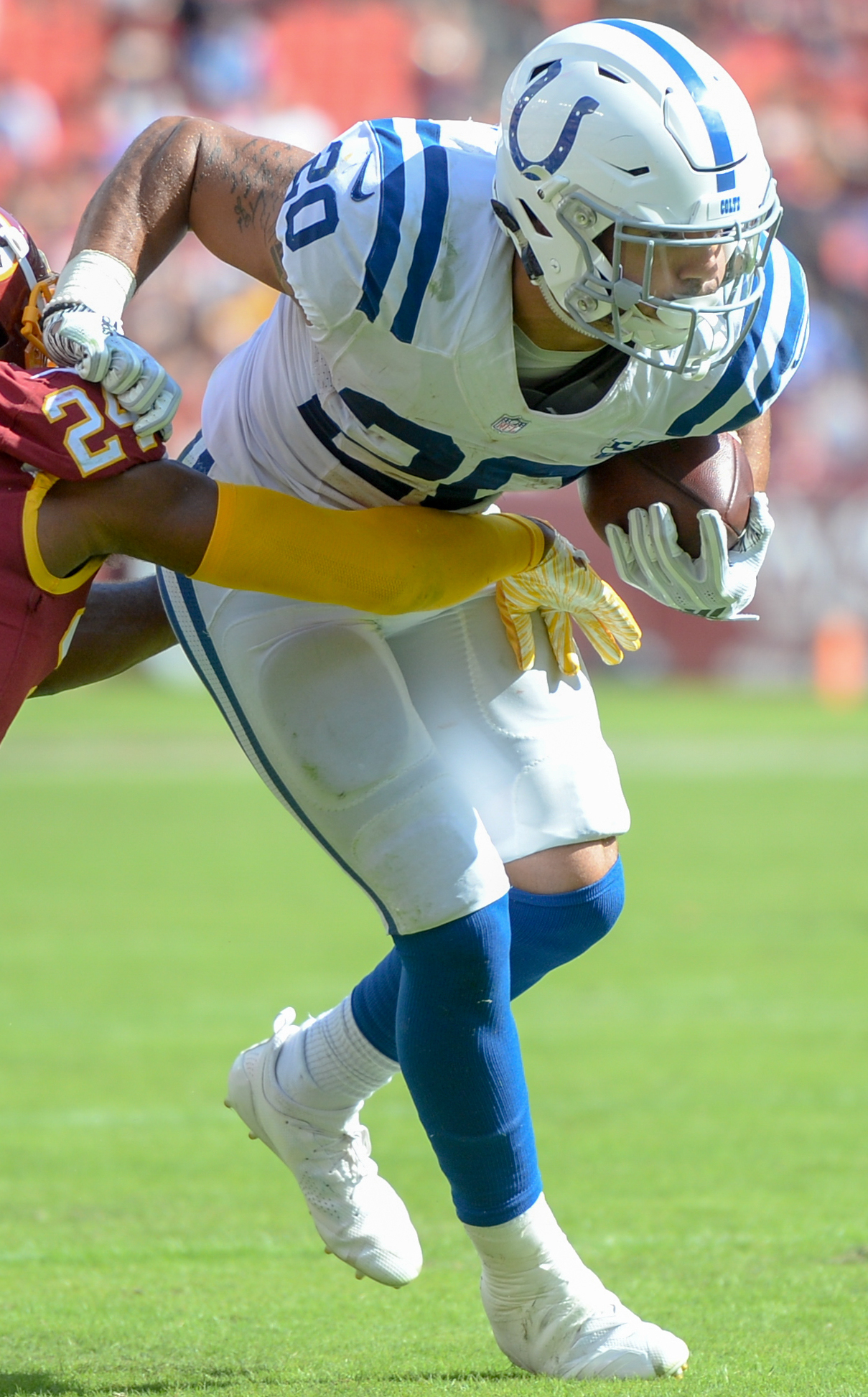
- Wilkins with the Indianapolis Colts in 2018

No. 20
- Position: Running back

Personal information
- Born: July 18, 1994 (age 32); Memphis, Tennessee, U.S.
- Listed height: 6 ft 1 in (1.85 m)
- Listed weight: 212 lb (96 kg)

Career information
- High school: Saint Benedict at Auburndale (Cordova, Tennessee)
- College: Ole Miss (2014–2015, 2017)
- NFL draft: 2018: 5th round, 169th overall pick

Career history
- Indianapolis Colts (2018–2021); Jacksonville Jaguars (2021)*; Tennessee Titans (2021); Indianapolis Colts (2022); Cleveland Browns (2023)
- * Offseason or practice squad member only

Career NFL statistics
- Games played: 54
- Games started: 4
- Rushing yards: 1,009
- Rushing average: 4.9
- Rushing touchdowns: 4
- Receptions: 41
- Receiving yards: 262
- Receiving touchdowns: 0
- Stats at Pro Football Reference

Jordan Wilkins (born July 18, 1994) is an American former professional football player who was a running back in the National Football League (NFL). He played college football for the Ole Miss Rebels.

== Early life ==
Wilkins attended and played high school football at Saint Benedict at Auburndale. He was considered as a four-star prospect. He received offers from Ole Miss, Auburn, Arkansas, Cincinnati, Memphis, Middle Tennessee State, Mississippi State, Purdue, Tennessee, Texas Tech, Vanderbilt, and Wisconsin. He originally committed to Auburn before his senior season. After a coaching change following Auburn's 2012 season, he decommitted and eventually signed and played for Ole Miss.

== College career ==
Wilkins attended and played college football at the University of Mississippi from 2013 to 2017. He was redshirted as a freshman in 2013. In the 2014 season, he had 361 rushing yards and one rushing touchdown in 13 games. The significant amount of his production came in the game against Presbyterian, where he had 171 rushing yards and a rushing touchdown. In the 2015 season, he had 379 rushing yards and four rushing touchdowns. He had to sit out the 2016 season due to academic ineligibility. In his final season at Ole Miss in 2017, he had a stellar season. He rushed for over 100 yards in six games. Overall, he finished the season with 1,011 rushing yards and nine rushing touchdowns. He finished eighth in the Southeastern Conference in rushing yards and ninth in rushing touchdowns in 2017. In his college career, he had 1,751 yards and 14 touchdowns at 6.4 yards per carry.

=== Collegiate statistics ===
Year	School	Conf	Class	Pos	G	Rushing				Receiving			
Year	School	Conf	Class	Pos	G	Att	Yds	Avg	TD	Rec	Yds	Avg	TD
2014	Ole Miss	SEC	FR	RB	13	52	361	6.9	1	1	6	6.0	0
2015	Ole Miss	SEC	SO	RB	13	72	379	5.3	4	5	75	15.0	0
2017	Ole Miss	SEC	SR	RB	12	155	1,011	6.5	9	26	241	9.3	1
Career	Ole Miss				38	279	1,751	6.3	14	32	322	10.1	1

== Professional career ==
Pre-draft measurables
Height	Weight	Arm length	Hand span	40-yard dash	10-yard split	20-yard split	20-yard shuttle	Vertical jump	Broad jump	Bench press
6 ft 0 5/8 in (1.84 m)	216 lb (98 kg)	30 1/8 in (0.77 m)	9 3/8 in (0.24 m)	4.53 s	1.56 s	2.69 s	4.22 s	37.0 in (0.94 m)	10 ft 3 in (3.12 m)	16 reps
All values from NFL Combine

=== Indianapolis Colts (first stint) ===
Wilkins was selected by the Indianapolis Colts in the fifth round with the 169th overall pick in the 2018 NFL draft. In the season-opening 34–23 loss to the Cincinnati Bengals, Wilkins had 14 carries for 40 rushing yards to go along with three receptions for 21 receiving yards in his NFL debut. He scored his first rushing touchdown against the Tennessee Titans in Week 11. Marlon Mack returned to the Colts' backfield and caused Wilkins' production to decrease. He remained a threat rushing and receiving throughout the remainder of the season. He finished with 336 rushing yards, one rushing touchdown, 16 receptions, and 85 receiving yards. He made his playoff debut in the Wild Card Round against the Houston Texans with nine rushing yards in the 21–7 victory. In the Divisional Round loss to the Kansas City Chiefs, he had an 11-yard kickoff return.

In the 2019 season, Wilkins finished with 51 carries for 307 rushing yards and two rushing touchdowns in 14 games.

In Week 8 of the 2020 season, Wilkins had 113 yards from scrimmage and a rushing touchdown in the 41–21 victory over the Detroit Lions. He finished the 2020 regular season with 84 carries for 308 rushing yards and one rushing touchdown to go along with 12 receptions for 105 receiving yards. He was placed on the reserve/COVID-19 list by the Colts on January 3, 2021, and activated on January 20. On October 30, 2021, Wilkins was waived by the Colts.

=== Jacksonville Jaguars ===
On November 8, 2021, the Jacksonville Jaguars signed Wilkins to their practice squad. He was released on December 7.

=== Tennessee Titans ===
On December 8, 2021, Wilkins was signed to the Titans practice squad. His contract expired when the teams season ended on January 22, 2022. He re-signed with the team on March 18, 2022. He was released on August 16, 2022.

=== Indianapolis Colts (second stint) ===
On November 2, 2022, the Colts signed Wilkins to their practice squad. He was promoted to the active roster on December 20. He was released on January 3, 2023.

=== Cleveland Browns ===
On August 13, 2023, Wilkins signed with the Cleveland Browns. On August 27, 2023, Wilkins was released by the Browns. Wilkins was re-signed by the Browns to their practice squad on October 24, 2023. He was released on October 31.

== NFL career statistics ==
Year	Team	Games		Rushing					Receiving					Fumbles	
Year	Team	GP	GS	Att	Yds	Avg	Lng	TD	Rec	Yds	Avg	Lng	TD	Fum	Lost
2018	IND	16	3	60	336	5.6	53	1	16	85	5.3	17	0	2	0
2019	IND	14	1	51	307	6.0	55	2	7	43	6.1	11	0	0	0
2020	IND	15	0	84	308	3.7	22	1	12	105	8.8	24	0	0	0
2021	IND	4	0	0	0	0.0	0	0	0	0	0.0	0	0	0	0
2021	TEN	1	0	0	0	0.0	0	0	0	0	0	0	0	0	0
2022	IND	4	0	13	58	4.5	9	0	6	29	4.8	10	0	0	0
Career		54	4	209	1,009	4.9	55	4	41	262	6.4	24	0	2	0
