= Eric Ebron =

American football player (born 1993)

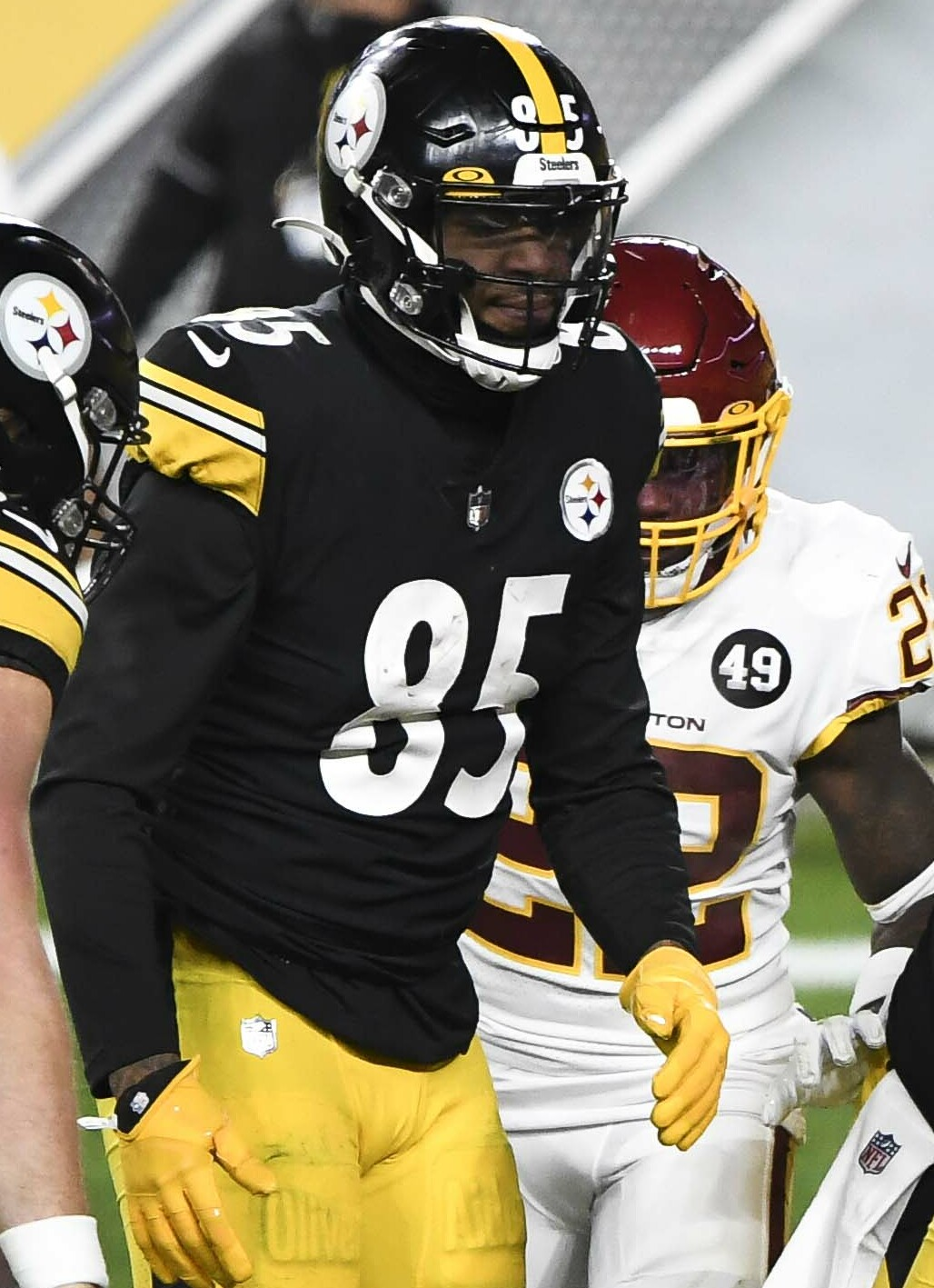
- Ebron with the Pittsburgh Steelers in 2020

No. 85
- Position: Tight end

Personal information
- Born: April 10, 1993 (age 33); Newark, New Jersey, U.S.
- Listed height: 6 ft 4 in (1.93 m)
- Listed weight: 253 lb (115 kg)

Career information
- High school: Ben L. Smith (Greensboro, North Carolina)
- College: North Carolina (2011–2013)
- NFL draft: 2014: 1st round, 10th overall pick

Career history
- Detroit Lions (2014–2017); Indianapolis Colts (2018–2019); Pittsburgh Steelers (2020–2021)

Awards and highlights
- Pro Bowl (2018); Second-team All-American (2013); First-team All-ACC (2013); Second-team All-ACC (2012)

Career NFL statistics
- Receptions: 351
- Receiving yards: 3,837
- Receiving touchdowns: 33
- Stats at Pro Football Reference

Eric Ebron (born April 10, 1993) is an American former professional football player who was a tight end in the National Football League (NFL) for eight seasons. He played college football for the North Carolina Tar Heels, and was selected by the Detroit Lions in the first round of the 2014 NFL draft. He also played for the Indianapolis Colts and Pittsburgh Steelers.

== Early life ==
Ebron was born in Newark, New Jersey and moved to Providence, Rhode Island as a toddler. Ebron first attended North Providence High School. He played football for the North Providence Jets. He later moved to North Carolina in 2008, where he attended Ben L. Smith High School in Greensboro. He played both tight end and defensive end while at Ben L. Smith High School. He had 28 receptions for 682 yards and 10 touchdowns on offense and 68 tackles and 13.5 sacks on defense.

Considered a three-star recruit by Rivals.com, Ebron was rated as the 21st best tight end prospect of his class.

College recruiting
Name	Hometown	School	Height	Weight	40^{‡}	Commit date
Eric Ebron; TE	North Providence, RI	North Providence HS/Ben L Smith HS	6 ft 4 in (1.93 m)	253 lb (115 kg)	4.67	Mar 18, 2010
Eric Ebron; TE	Recruit ratings: Scout: Rivals: (80)					
Overall recruit ranking: Scout: 20 (TE) Rivals: 21 (TE), Not Ranked (National), 18 (NC)
‡ Refers to 40-yard dash; Note: In many cases, Scout, Rivals, 247Sports, On3, and ESPN may conflict in their listings of height, weight and 40 time.; In these cases, the average was taken. ESPN grades are on a 100-point scale.; Sources: "North Carolina Commit List for 2011". Rivals.; "Scout.com Football Recruiting: North Carolina". Scout.; "RecruitTracker 2011: North Carolina". ESPN.; "Scout.com Team Recruiting Rankings". Scout.; "2011 Team Ranking". Rivals.com.

== College career ==
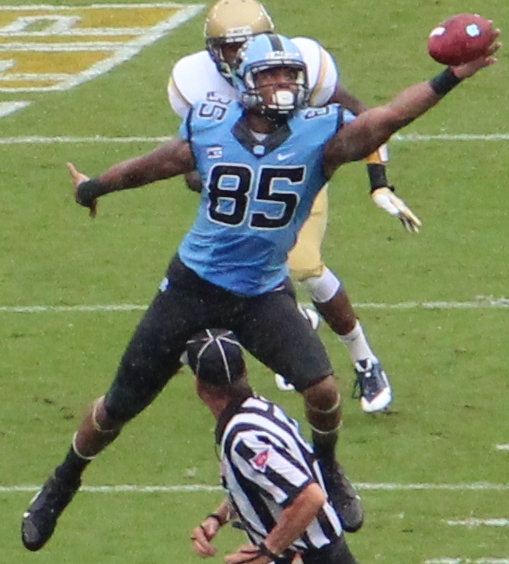
Ebron playing for the Tar Heels in 2013

Ebron attended the University of North Carolina from 2011 to 2013. As a true freshman in 2011, Ebron played in 10 games, recording 10 receptions for 207 yards and a touchdown. As a sophomore in 2012, he started in all 11 games, recording 40 receptions for 625 yards and four touchdowns. The receptions and receiving yards were a North Carolina record for tight ends. As a junior in 2013, Ebron caught 62 passes for 973 yards and three touchdowns, and was a first-team All-Atlantic Coast Conference (ACC) selection. He was also chosen as a finalist for the John Mackey Award, given to the nation's top tight end.

On November 25, 2013, Ebron announced his intentions to forgo his remaining eligibility and enter the 2014 NFL draft.

== Professional career ==
=== Pre-draft ===
On November 25, 2013, Ebron announced he would forgo his remaining college eligibility and enter the 2014 NFL draft. Ebron attended the NFL Scouting Combine in Indianapolis and completed the majority of drills, but opted to skip the short shuttle and three-cone drill after sustaining a minor injury. He ran the second fastest time in the 40-yard dash among all tight ends participating at the NFL Combine, finishing only behind Tennessee State tight end A. C. Leonard (4.50s).

External videos
- Eric Ebron's NFL Combine Workout
- Eric Ebron runs the 40-yard dash

On March 25, 2014, Ebron participated in North Carolina's pro day, but elected to stand on his combine numbers and only performed the short shuttle, three-cone drill, and positional drills. During positional drills, Ebron dropped three passes from quarterback Bryn Renner. Multiple NFL draft experts stated Ebron looked poor in his positional drills and highlighted the drops as a cause for concern. Ebron attended pre-draft visits with multiple teams, including the Baltimore Ravens, Buffalo Bills, Detroit Lions, and Carolina Panthers. At the conclusion of the pre-draft process, Ebron was projected to be among the first 20 players selected by NFL draft experts and scouts. He was ranked as the top tight end prospect in the draft by DraftScout.com, NFL analyst Bucky Brooks, NFL analyst Mike Mayock, and Sports Illustrated.

Pre-draft measurables
Height	Weight	Arm length	Hand span	Wingspan	40-yard dash	10-yard split	20-yard split	20-yard shuttle	Three-cone drill	Vertical jump	Broad jump	Bench press	Wonderlic
6 ft 4 3/8 in (1.94 m)	250 lb (113 kg)	33 1/4 in (0.84 m)	10 in (0.25 m)	6 ft 8 3/8 in (2.04 m)	4.60 s	1.63 s	2.71 s	4.45 s	7.49 s	32 in (0.81 m)	10 ft 0 in (3.05 m)	24 reps	16
All values from NFL Combine and North Carolina's Pro Day

=== Detroit Lions ===
==== 2014 ====
The Lions selected Ebron in the first round (10th overall) of the 2014 NFL draft. Ebron was the first tight end drafted and became the eighth highest selection from North Carolina in school history. He also became the highest tight end to be drafted by the Lions in franchise history, surpassing David Lewis (20th overall, 1985) and Brandon Pettigrew (20th overall, 2009), although he has since been supplanted by T. J. Hockenson (8th overall, 2019) On June 13, 2014, the Lions signed Ebron to a fully guaranteed four-year, $12.49 million contract that includes a signing bonus of $7.22 million.

External videos
- Detroit Lions draft Eric Ebron 10th overall
- First Draft: North Carolina TE Eric Ebron

Throughout training camp, Ebron competed to be a starting tight end against Pettigrew and Joseph Fauria. Head coach Jim Caldwell named Ebron the third tight end on the depth chart, behind Pettigrew and Fauria, to begin the regular season.

External videos
- Eric Ebron scores his first NFL touchdown

He made his professional regular season debut in the Lions' season-opening 35–14 victory against the New York Giants. In Week 2, he caught three passes for a season-high 38 yards during a 24–7 loss against the Panthers. On September 28, 2014, Ebron made three receptions for 34-yards and caught his first career touchdown during a 24–17 win at the New York Jets in Week 4. Ebron caught his first career touchdown on a 16-yard pass from quarterback Matthew Stafford during the second quarter. Ebron was sidelined for three games (Weeks 7–9) due to a hamstring injury. He finished his rookie season in 2014 with 25 receptions for 248 receiving yards and one touchdown in 13 games and seven starts.

==== 2015 ====
He entered training camp in 2015 as the No. 2 tight end on the depth chart. Caldwell retained Ebron as the backup tight end to Pettigrew to start the regular season. On September 20, 2015, Ebron caught a season-high five passes for 43-yards and a touchdown during a 26–16 loss at the Minnesota Vikings in a Week 2. Ebron sustained a hamstring injury during a Week 4 loss at the Seattle Seahawks and was inactive for the next two games (Weeks 5–6). In Week 7, Ebron recorded five receptions for a season-high 89 receiving yards and one touchdown during a 28–19 loss against the Vikings. On October 26, 2015, the Lions fired offensive coordinator Joe Lombardi. He finished the 2015 NFL season with 47 receptions for 537 receiving yards and five touchdowns in 14 games and eight starts.

==== 2016 ====
Ebron entered the regular season as the No. 1 tight end on the Lions depth chart. He replaced Pettigrew who was placed on the physically unable to perform list after tearing his ACL the previous season. In Week 4, Ebron suffered injuries to his knee and ankle during a 17–14 loss at the Chicago Bears and was subsequently sidelined for the next three games (Weeks 5–7). On November 20, 2016, Ebron made three catches for 70-yards and scored his first career rushing touchdown on a one-yard carry during the fourth quarter of a 26–19 win against the Jacksonville Jaguars in Week 11. In Week 16, he made a season-high eight receptions for 93-yards as the Lions lost 42–21 at the Dallas Cowboys. Ebron finished the 2016 NFL season with 61 receptions for 711 receiving yards and one touchdown in 13 games and 13 starts.

On January 7, 2017, Ebron started in his first career playoff game in the Wild Card Round, catching two passes for 23 yards as the Lions lost to the Seahawks by 26–6.

==== 2017 ====
External videos
- Matt Stafford finds Eric Ebron for 61-yard gain

On May 2, 2017, the Lions exercised the fifth-year option on Ebron's rookie contract. The $8.25 million option kept Ebron under contract throughout the 2018 NFL season. Caldwell retained Ebron as the No. 1 tight end after the departure of Pettigrew. On December 10, 2017, Ebron caught a season-high ten passes for 94-yards during a 24–21 victory at the Tampa Bay Buccaneers in Week 14. He finished the season with 53 receptions for 574 receiving yards and four touchdowns in 16 games and nine starts.

==== 2018 ====
On March 14, 2018, the Lions released Ebron.

Ebron met with the Indianapolis Colts and Carolina Panthers during free agency.

=== Indianapolis Colts ===
==== 2018 ====
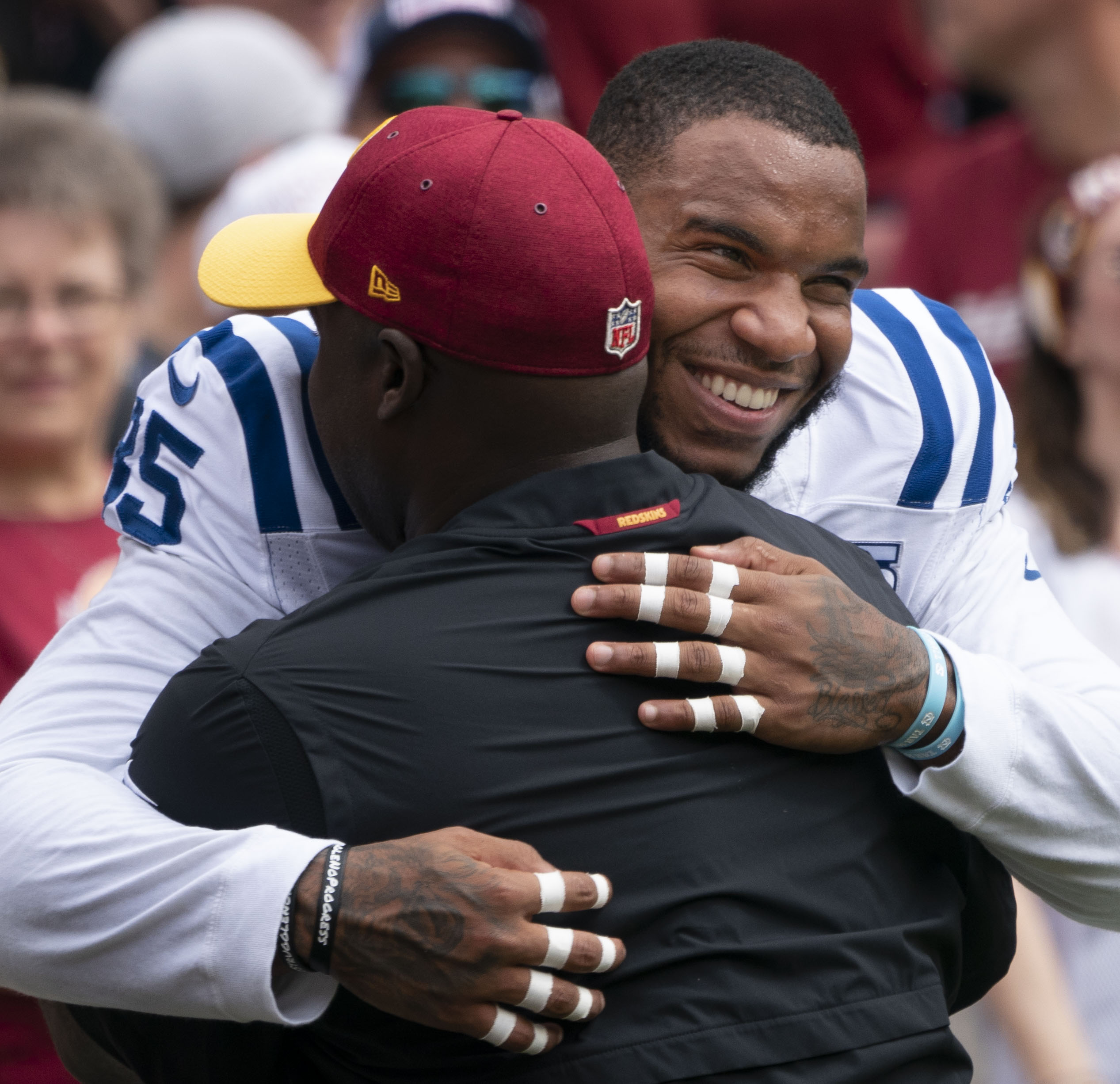
Ebron hugging former North Carolina assistant coach Randy Jordan in 2018

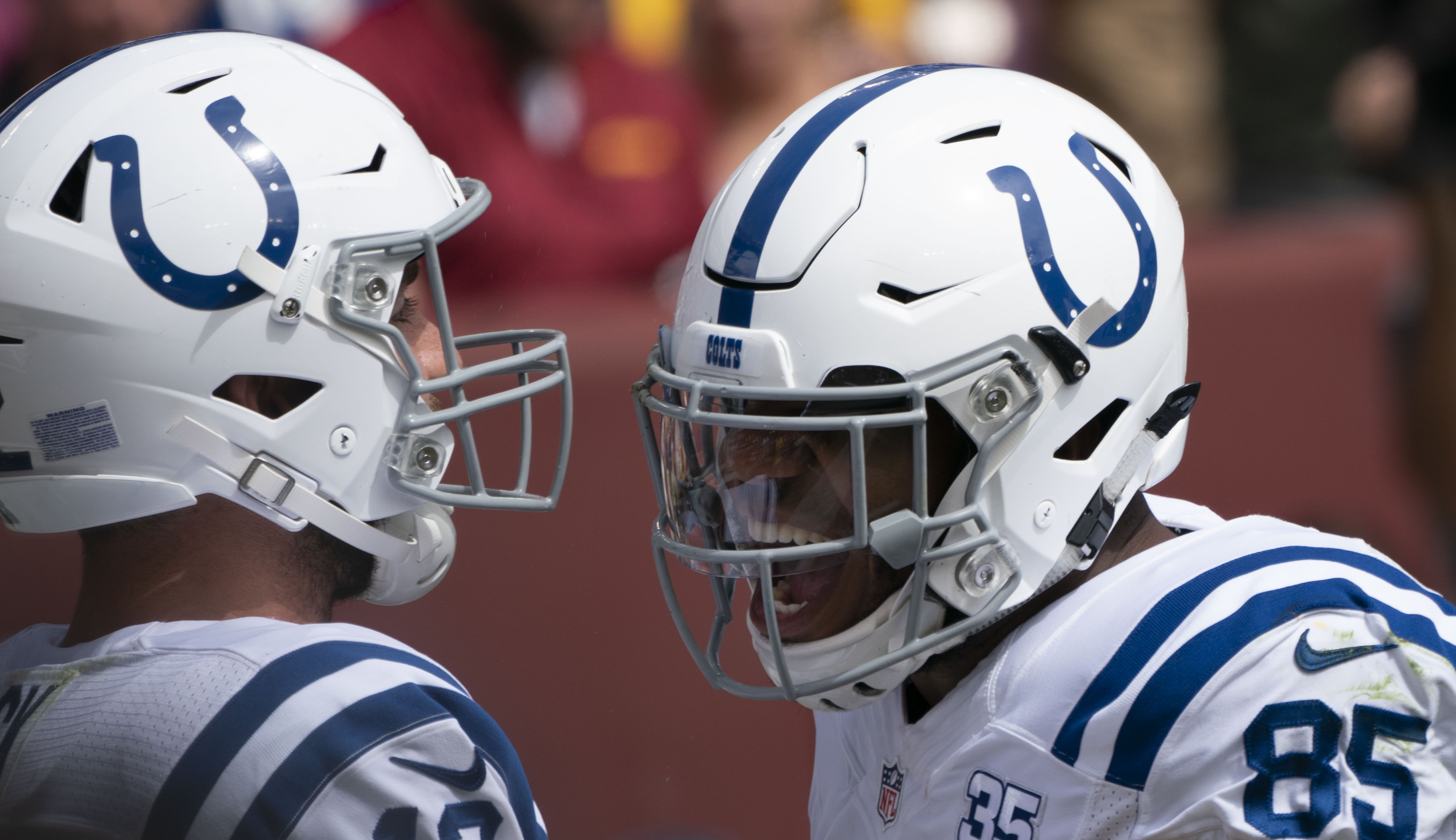
Ebron with quarterback Andrew Luck in 2018

On March 19, 2018, the Colts signed Ebron to a two-year, $13 million contract that includes $6.50 million guaranteed. Head coach Frank Reich named Ebron the backup tight end, behind Jack Doyle, to begin the regular season. Ebron became the primary starting tight end after Doyle sustained a hip injury in Week 2 and was sidelined for the next five games (Weeks 3–7).

External videos
- Andrew Luck goes deep to Eric Ebron
- See Eric Ebron sneak his way into the end zone
- Eric Ebron adds to huge day with late TD catch

On October 10, 2018, Ebron recorded nine receptions for a career-high 105 receiving yards and two receiving touchdowns during a 38–24 loss at the New England Patriots in a Week 5. On November 11, 2018, Ebron caught three passes for 69-yards and two touchdown receptions and also had a two-yard rushing touchdown during a 29–26 victory against the Jaguars in Week 11. In Week 12, Ebron caught five passes for 45 receiving yards and two touchdowns. As a result of those two touchdowns, he passed Dallas Clark for most receiving touchdown in a single season by a Colts tight end. The Colts defeated the Miami Dolphins 27–24. The following game, Ebron returned to his role as the de facto starting tight end after Doyle sustained a kidney injury and was placed on injured reserve for the remainder of the season on November 26, 2018. On December 2, 2018, he made a season-high ten receptions for 81-yards during a 6–0 loss at the Jacksonville Jaguars in Week 13. On December 18, 2018, it was announced that Ebron was selected to play in the 2019 Pro Bowl, marking the first Pro Bowl selection of his career. He finished his first season with the Colts in 2018 with 66 receptions for 750 receiving yards and 13 touchdown receptions in 16 games and eight starts. Ebron recorded career highs in receptions, receiving yards, and receiving touchdowns in 2018 and led all tight ends with 13 touchdown receptions. His 13 touchdown receptions tied Green Bay Packers wide receiver Davante Adams as the second most among all players, behind Pittsburgh Steelers wide receiver Antonio Brown (15 touchdowns). He received an overall grade of 68.7 from Pro Football Focus, which ranked 23rd among all qualifying tight ends in 2018.

External videos
- Top Plays from Ebron's 105-yard game vs. Pats
- Breakdown: Eric Ebron's phenomenal year

The Colts finished second in the AFC South with a 10–6 record and earned a Wild Card Round berth. On January 5, 2019, Ebron started in his first playoff game for the Colts and caught three passes for 26 yards and scored one touchdown in the 21–7 win over the Houston Texans in the AFC Wild Card Round. He was ranked 66th by his fellow players on the NFL Top 100 Players of 2019.

==== 2019 ====
Reich named Ebron and Doyle the starting tight ends to start the season with Doyle serving as the primary starter. In Week 7 against the Texans, Ebron caught four receptions for 70 yards, and one touchdown in a 30–23 win. On November 25, 2019, Ebron was placed on season-ending injured reserve with an ankle injury. Overall, Ebron finished the 2019 season with 31 receptions for 375 receiving yards and three receiving touchdowns.

=== Pittsburgh Steelers ===
On March 30, 2020, Ebron signed a two-year, $12 million contract with the Steelers. In Week 3 against the Texans, Ebron caught 5 passes for 52 yards and his first receiving touchdown as a Steeler during the 28–21 win. He was placed on the reserve/COVID-19 list by the team on January 2, 2021, and activated five days later. Ebron finished the 2020 season with 56 receptions for 558 receiving yards and five receiving touchdowns. In the Wild Card Round of the playoffs against the Cleveland Browns, Ebron recorded seven catches for 62 yards and a touchdown during the 48–37 loss.

Ebron entered the 2021 season as the Steelers starting tight end. He was soon passed on the depth chart by rookie Pat Freiermuth. He was placed on injured reserve on November 27, 2021. He played in eight games and recorded 12 receptions for 84 receiving yards and a receiving touchdown in the 2021 season.

On December 4, 2024, Ebron announced his retirement from professional football.

== Career statistics ==
=== NFL ===
Year	Team	Games		Receiving					Rushing					Fumbles	
Year	Team	GP	GS	Rec	Yds	Avg	Lng	TD	Att	Yds	Avg	Lng	TD	Fum	Lost
2014	DET	13	7	25	248	9.9	22	1	—	—	—	—	—	0	0
2015	DET	14	8	47	537	11.4	55	5	—	—	—	—	—	0	0
2016	DET	13	13	61	711	11.7	61	1	1	1	1.0	1T	1	0	0
2017	DET	16	9	53	574	10.8	44	4	—	—	—	—	—	1	1
2018	IND	16	8	66	750	11.4	53T	13	3	−8	−2.7	2T	1	1	1
2019	IND	11	2	31	375	12.1	48T	3	—	—	—	—	—	0	0
2020	PIT	15	9	56	558	10.0	27	5	—	—	—	—	—	1	1
2021	PIT	8	3	12	84	7.0	19	1	1	1	1.0	1T	1	0	0
Career		106	59	351	3,837	10.9	61	33	5	−6	−1.2	2	3	3	3

=== College ===
Season	Team	Conf	Class	Pos	GP	Rec	Yds	Avg	TD
2011	North Carolina	ACC	FR	TE	10	10	207	20.7	1
2012	North Carolina	ACC	SO	TE	11	40	625	15.6	4
2013	North Carolina	ACC	JR	TE	13	62	973	15.7	3
Career					34	112	1,805	16.1	8
