= Chester Rogers =

American football player (born 1994)

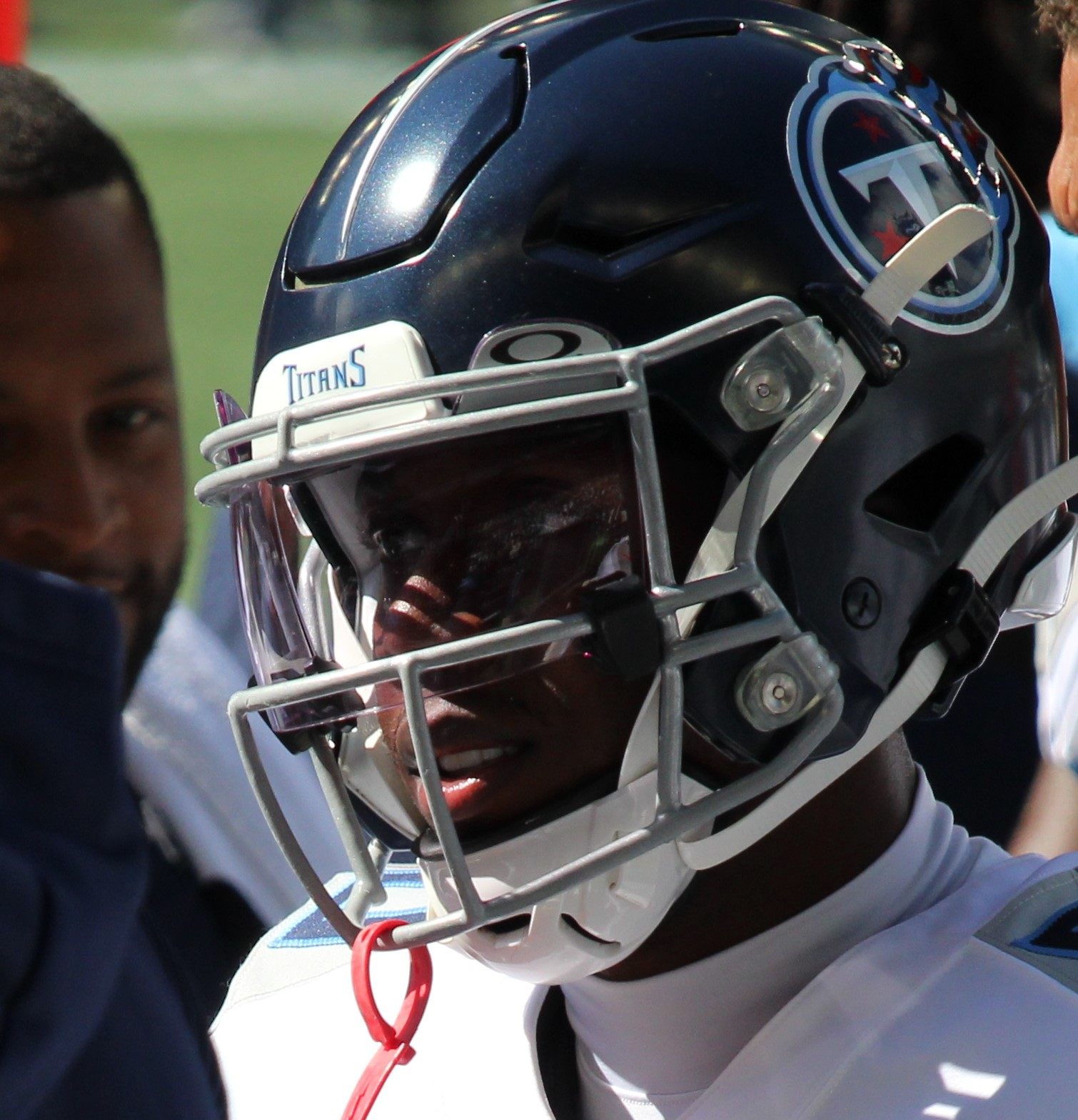
- Rogers with the Tennessee Titans in 2021

No. 80
- Position: Wide receiver

Personal information
- Born: January 12, 1994 (age 32); Huntsville, Alabama, U.S.
- Listed height: 6 ft 0 in (1.83 m)
- Listed weight: 184 lb (83 kg)

Career information
- High school: Lee (Huntsville)
- College: Grambling State
- NFL draft: 2016: undrafted

Career history
- Indianapolis Colts (2016–2019); Miami Dolphins (2020)*; Tennessee Titans (2020–2021); Houston Texans (2022)*; Cleveland Browns (2022)*
- * Offseason or practice squad member only

Career NFL statistics
- Receptions: 141
- Receiving yards: 1,522
- Receiving average: 10.8
- Return yards: 1,356
- Total touchdowns: 6
- Stats at Pro Football Reference

Chester Rogers (born January 12, 1994) is an American former professional football player who was a wide receiver in the National Football League (NFL). He played college football for the Grambling State Tigers and signed with the Indianapolis Colts as an undrafted free agent in 2016.

== Acting career ==
Chester Rogers started acting when he was 10 years old with the stage name of Tre Rogers. His first movie, Constellation was filmed in his hometown of Huntsville, Alabama, where he played a younger version of the character played by actor Billy Dee Williams. Afterwards, Chester and his mom decided to pursue acting, and move out to California for four years. During that time, he also was in Madea's Family Reunion, Re-Animated on Cartoon Network, and Dirty with Cuba Gooding Jr. He was also originally cast in both Everybody Hates Chris and House of Payne, before the parts were recast after changes were made to the shows. He then put acting on hold to go to Grambling State to pursue football.

== College career ==
Rogers attended and played college football at Grambling State University from 2012 to 2015. He finished his college career with totals of 153 receptions for 2,232 yards and 15 touchdowns.

== Professional career ==
=== Indianapolis Colts ===
Rogers was signed by the Indianapolis Colts as an undrafted free agent on May 2, 2016. He finished the 2016 season with 19 catches for 273 yards while playing in 14 games for the Colts.

On November 12, 2017, during Week 10 against the Pittsburgh Steelers, Rogers posted his first career game with over 100 yards of receiving, finishing with 104 receiving yards on six receptions and a touchdown, but the Colts lost the game 20–17. Overall, in the 2017 season, he finished with 23 receptions for 284 receiving yards and one receiving touchdown.

Going into the 2018 season, Rogers remained in the rotation for the Colts. In Week 6, against the New York Jets, he scored his first receiving touchdown of the season. In Week 16, Rogers caught the go-ahead score with 55 seconds remaining to beat the New York Giants 28–27. He finished the season playing in all 16 games with 10 starts, recording 53 receptions for 485 yards and two touchdowns.

Entering 2019, Rogers was named the fourth wide receiver on the depth chart. He suffered a knee fracture in Week 13 and was placed on injured reserve on December 2, 2019. He finished the season with 16 catches for 179 yards and two touchdowns through 12 games and six starts. He became a free agent following the season.

=== Miami Dolphins ===
On August 9, 2020, Rogers signed a one-year contract with the Miami Dolphins. He was released on September 2, 2020.

=== Tennessee Titans ===
On September 21, 2020, Rogers was signed to the practice squad of the Tennessee Titans. He was signed to a futures contract on January 11, 2021.

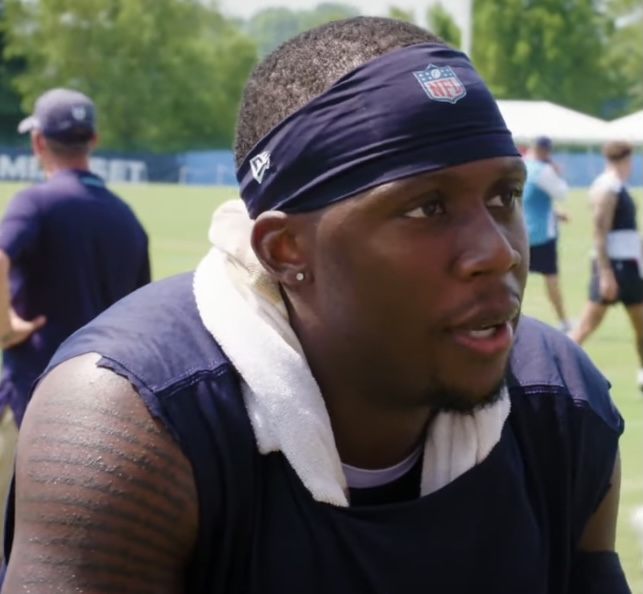
Rogers with the Titans in 2021

Rogers made his first appearance with the Titans in Week 1 of the 2021 season. On the year, he finished with 30 receptions for 301 yards and a touchdown while carving a role as a kick and punt returner.

=== Houston Texans ===
On August 2, 2022, Rogers signed with the Houston Texans. He was placed on injured reserve on August 21, 2022. He was released on August 29.

=== Cleveland Browns ===
On September 13, 2022, Rogers signed with the practice squad of the Cleveland Browns. On September 22, Rogers was promoted to the active roster for the team's Week 3 game against the Pittsburgh Steelers. He was released on November 28. He played in three games for the Browns in the 2022 season.

== Career statistics ==
=== NFL ===
Regular season statistics
Season	Team	Games		Receiving					Rushing					Punt returns					Kick returns					Fumbles	
Season	Team	GP	GS	Rec	Yds	Avg	Lng	TD	Att	Yds	Avg	Lng	TD	Ret	Yds	Avg	Lng	TD	Ret	Yds	Avg	Lng	TD	Fmb	Lost
2016	IND	14	2	19	273	14.4	36	0	–	–	–	–	–	13	119	9.2	30	0	–	–	–	–	–	2	0
2017	IND	11	4	23	284	12.3	61	1	3	8	2.7	7	0	10	80	8.0	30	0	1	5	5.0	5	0	–	–
2018	IND	16	10	53	485	9.2	34	2	1	−4	−4.0	−4	0	23	215	9.3	51	0	1	10	10.0	10	0	1	0
2019	IND	12	6	16	179	11.2	27	2	1	18	18.0	18	0	14	137	9.8	21	0	3	27	9.0	13	0	2	1
2021	TEN	16	2	30	301	10.0	39	1	1	9	9.0	9	0	30	293	9.8	55	0	14	282	20.1	37	0	4	1
Total		69	24	141	1,522	10.8	61	6	6	31	5.2	18	0	90	844	9.4	55	0	19	324	17.1	37	0	9	2

=== College ===
Year	Team	G	Rec	Yds	Yd/Rec	TDs
2012	Grambling State	5	6	78	13.0	0
2013	Grambling State	11	48	735	15.3	5
2014	Grambling State	12	53	712	13.4	4
2015	Grambling State	12	46	707	15.4	6
Career		40	153	2,232	14.6	15
