= 2018 Indianapolis Colts season =

66th season in franchise history; final one with Andrew Luck

- Owner: Jim Irsay
- General manager: Chris Ballard
- Head coach: Frank Reich
- Offensive coordinator: Nick Sirianni
- Defensive coordinator: Matt Eberflus
- Home stadium: Lucas Oil Stadium

Results
- Record: 10–6
- Division place: 2nd AFC South
- Playoffs: Won Wild Card Playoffs (at Texans) 21–7; Lost Divisional Playoffs (at Chiefs) 13–31
- All-Pros: G Quenton Nelson; LB Shaquille Leonard
- Pro Bowlers: QB Andrew Luck; TE Eric Ebron; G Quenton Nelson

Uniform
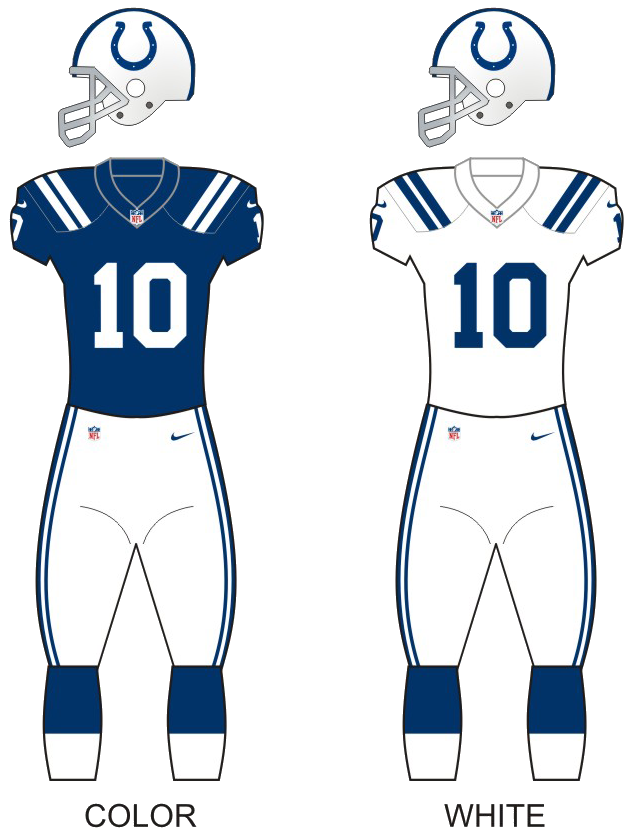

The 2018 season was the Indianapolis Colts' 66th in the National Football League (NFL), their 35th in Indianapolis, and their 11th playing their home games at Lucas Oil Stadium. It was also their first season under head coach Frank Reich and second under the leadership of general manager Chris Ballard. Despite a 1–5 start, the Colts managed to improve on their injury-plagued 4–12 campaign from the year prior with a 38–10 victory over the Tennessee Titans, and a 5-game winning streak. On Week 16, the Colts achieved their first winning season since 2014 with a 28–27 win against the New York Giants. The next week, they beat the Tennessee Titans in a win or go home match-up to reach the playoffs for the first time since 2014 and became the third team in NFL history to qualify for the playoffs after a 1–5 start and first since the 2015 Chiefs.

In the wild-card round, the Colts defeated the Houston Texans 21–7, but lost to the Kansas City Chiefs in the divisional round 31–13, ending their season. To date, this is the most recent season the Colts have won a playoff game.

This would be the last season that the Colts would have franchise quarterback Andrew Luck, as he would retire following the season, citing his continuous struggle with injuries and no longer enjoying the game.

== Offseason ==
=== Coaching changes ===
On December 31, 2017, the Colts parted ways with head coach Chuck Pagano, who had led the team for six seasons. After two interviews, it was widely reported that the Colts would hire New England Patriots' offensive coordinator Josh McDaniels to replace him, after McDaniels fulfilled his obligations to the Patriots in Super Bowl LII. The Colts announced on the team website that they had agreed to terms with McDaniels and scheduled a press conference with McDaniels for February 5, 2018. However, one day later, McDaniels unexpectedly withdrew from the agreement in principle to become the Colts' head coach. On February 11, 2018, after interviewing multiple candidates, including Leslie Frazier and Dan Campbell, the Colts announced the hiring of Frank Reich, formerly the Philadelphia Eagles' offensive coordinator.

== Draft ==
2018 Indianapolis Colts Draft
Round	Selection	Player	Position	College	Notes
1	6	Quenton Nelson	Guard	Notre Dame	From NY Jets
2	36	Shaquille Leonard	Linebacker	South Carolina State	
2	37	Braden Smith	Guard	Auburn	From NY Jets
2	52	Kemoko Turay	Defensive end	Rutgers	From Baltimore via Philadelphia
2	64	Tyquan Lewis	Defensive end	Ohio State	From Philadelphia via Cleveland
4	104	Nyheim Hines	Running back	NC State	
5	159	Daurice Fountain	Wide receiver	Northern Iowa	From Kansas City via Cleveland, New England, and Oakland
5	169	Jordan Wilkins	Running back	Ole Miss	From Philadelphia
6	185	Deon Cain	Wide receiver	Clemson	From Oakland
7	221	Matthew Adams	Linebacker	Houston	
7	235	Zaire Franklin	Linebacker	Syracuse	From Seattle via NY Jets

Draft trades

- The Colts traded their first-round selection (3rd overall) to the Jets in exchange for the Jets' first-round selection (6th overall), two second-round selections (37th and 49th overall), and their second-round selection in 2019.
- The Colts traded a second-round selection they received from the Jets (49th overall) to the Eagles in exchange for the Eagles' second-round selection (52nd overall) and fifth-round selection (169th overall).
- The Colts traded their third-round selection (67th overall) and their sixth-round selection (178th overall) to the Browns in exchange for the Browns' second-round selection (64th overall).
- The Colts traded their fifth-round selection (140th overall) to the Raiders in exchange for the Raiders' fifth-round selection (159th overall) and sixth-round selection (185th overall).
- The Colts traded defensive end Henry Anderson to the Jets in exchange for the Jets' seventh-round pick previously acquired from Seattle (235th overall).

== Staff ==
2018 Indianapolis Colts staff
Front office: Owner – Jim Irsay; General manager – Chris Ballard; Vice president of player personnel – Rex Hogan; Vice president of player personnel – Ed Dodds; Senior player personnel scout – Todd Vasvari; Director of football administration – Mike Bluem; Director of pro personnel – Kevin Rogers Jr.; Director of college scouting – Morocco Brown; Assistant director of college scouting – Matt Tarpening; Player personnel strategist – Brian Decker; Head coaches: Head Coach – Frank Reich; Offensive coaches: Offensive coordinator – Nick Sirianni; Assistant quarterbacks – Marcus Brady; Running backs – Tom Rathman; Wide receivers – Kevin Patullo; Tight ends – Tom Manning; Offensive line – Dave DeGuglielmo; Assistant offensive line – Bobby Johnson; Offensive quality control – Gunnard Twyner	Defensive coaches: Defensive coordinator – Matt Eberflus; Defensive line – Mike Phair; Linebackers – Dave Borgonzi; Cornerbacks – Jonathan Gannon; Safeties – Alan Williams; Defensive quality control – David Overstreet II; Pass Rush Consultant/Player Development – Robert Mathis; Special teams coaches: Special teams coordinator – Raymond Ventrone; Assistant special teams – Frank Ross; Strength and conditioning: Director of sports performance – Rusty Jones; Sports science & conditioning – Ryan Podell; Assistant strength and conditioning – Richard Howell; Assistant strength and conditioning – Doug McKenney

== Final roster ==
2018 Indianapolis Colts roster
Quarterbacks (QB): 7 Jacoby Brissett; 12 Andrew Luck; Running backs (RB): 21 Nyheim Hines; 25 Marlon Mack; 20 Jordan Wilkins; 39 Jonathan Williams; Wide receivers (WR): 10 Daurice Fountain; 11 Ryan Grant; 13 T. Y. Hilton; 15 Dontrelle Inman; 14 Zach Pascal; 80 Chester Rogers; Tight ends (TE): 81 Mo Alie-Cox; 85 Eric Ebron; 45 Ryan Hewitt	Offensive linemen (OL): 63 Josh Andrews G; 67 Evan Boehm C; 74 Anthony Castonzo T; 62 Le'Raven Clark T; 64 Mark Glowinski G; 73 Joe Haeg T/G; 78 Ryan Kelly C; 56 Quenton Nelson G; 72 Braden Smith T; Defensive linemen (DL): 96 Denico Autry DT; 92 Margus Hunt DE/DT; 94 Tyquan Lewis DE; 97 Al-Quadin Muhammad DE; 91 Hassan Ridgeway DT; 93 Jabaal Sheard DE; 90 Grover Stewart DT; 57 Kemoko Turay DE	Linebackers (LB): 49 Matthew Adams OLB; 44 Zaire Franklin OLB; 52 Najee Goode OLB; 53 Shaquille Leonard OLB; 54 Ahmad Thomas MLB; 50 Anthony Walker MLB; Defensive backs (DB): 32 Jalen Collins CB; 35 Pierre Desir CB; 26 Clayton Geathers SS; 27 Nate Hairston CB; 29 Malik Hooker FS; 28 Christopher Milton CB; 34 Mike Mitchell S; 36 Corey Moore SS; 23 Kenny Moore CB; 30 George Odum S; 37 J. J. Wilcox SS; 31 Quincy Wilson CB; Special teams (ST): 46 Luke Rhodes LS; 2 Rigoberto Sanchez P; 4 Adam Vinatieri K	Practice squad: 48 Billy Brown TE; 79 Antonio Garcia T; 83 Krishawn Hogan WR; 17 Steve Ishmael WR; 40 Tegray Scales MLB; 86 Erik Swoope TE; 5 P. J. Walker QB; 76 De'Ondre Wesley T; 95 DeShawn Williams DT; 58 Anthony Winbush DE; Reserve: 8 Deon Cain WR (IR); 84 Jack Doyle TE (IR); 41 Matthias Farley SS (IR); 16 Marcus Johnson WR (IR); 9 Brad Kaaya QB (IR); 20 Ronald Martin SS (IR); 55 Skai Moore MLB (IR); 59 Carroll Phillips DE (IR); 68 Matt Slauson G (IR); 43 Ross Travis TE (IR); 51 Jihad Ward DE (IR); 61 J'Marcus Webb T (IR); 99 Al Woods DT (IR); 13 James Wright WR (IR); Rookies in italics 53 active, 14 reserve, 10 practice squad

== Preseason ==
Week	Date	Opponent	Result	Record	Venue	Recap
1	August 9	at Seattle Seahawks	W 19–17	1–0	CenturyLink Field	Recap
2	August 20	Baltimore Ravens	L 19–20	1–1	Lucas Oil Stadium	Recap
3	August 25	San Francisco 49ers	W 23–17	2–1	Lucas Oil Stadium	Recap
4	August 30	at Cincinnati Bengals	W 27–26	3–1	Paul Brown Stadium	Recap

== Regular season ==
=== Schedule ===
The Colts' 2018 schedule was announced on April 19.

Week	Date	Opponent	Result	Record	Venue	Recap
1	September 9	Cincinnati Bengals	**L** 23–34	0–1	Lucas Oil Stadium	Recap
2	September 16	at Washington Redskins	**W** 21–9	1–1	FedEx Field	Recap
3	September 23	at Philadelphia Eagles	**L** 16–20	1–2	Lincoln Financial Field	Recap
4	September 30	**Houston Texans**	**L** 34–37 (OT)	1–3	Lucas Oil Stadium	Recap
5	October 4	at New England Patriots	**L** 24–38	1–4	Gillette Stadium	Recap
6	October 14	at New York Jets	**L** 34–42	1–5	MetLife Stadium	Recap
7	October 21	Buffalo Bills	**W** 37–5	2–5	Lucas Oil Stadium	Recap
8	October 28	at Oakland Raiders	**W** 42–28	3–5	Oakland–Alameda County Coliseum	Recap
9	Bye					
10	November 11	**Jacksonville Jaguars**	**W** 29–26	4–5	Lucas Oil Stadium	Recap
11	November 18	**Tennessee Titans**	**W** 38–10	5–5	Lucas Oil Stadium	Recap
12	November 25	Miami Dolphins	**W** 27–24	6–5	Lucas Oil Stadium	Recap
13	December 2	at **Jacksonville Jaguars**	**L** 0–6	6–6	TIAA Bank Field	Recap
14	December 9	at **Houston Texans**	**W** 24–21	7–6	NRG Stadium	Recap
15	December 16	Dallas Cowboys	**W** 23–0	8–6	Lucas Oil Stadium	Recap
16	December 23	New York Giants	**W** 28–27	9–6	Lucas Oil Stadium	Recap
17	December 30	at **Tennessee Titans**	**W** 33–17	10–6	Nissan Stadium	Recap

Note: Intra-division opponents are in bold text.

=== Game summaries ===
==== Week 1: vs. Cincinnati Bengals ====
Week One: Cincinnati Bengals at Indianapolis Colts – Game summary

Quarter	1	2	3	4	Total
**Bengals**	3	7	7	17	**34**
Colts	3	13	7	0	**23**

at Lucas Oil Stadium, Indianapolis, Indiana

- Date: September 9
- Game time: 1:00 p.m. EDT
- Game weather: None (retractable roof closed)
- Game attendance: 58,699
- Referee: Pete Morelli
- TV announcers (CBS): Andrew Catalon, James Lofton and Jane Slater
- Recap, Gamebook

Game information

**First quarter**

- CIN – Randy Bullock 42-yard field goal, 8:20. Bengals 3–0. **Drive: 10 plays, 69 yards, 4:50.**
- IND – Adam Vinatieri 21-yard field goal, 1:23. Tied 3–3. **Drive: 14 plays, 72 yards, 6:57.**

**Second quarter**

- IND – Eric Ebron 26-yard pass from Andrew Luck (Adam Vinatieri kick), 12:02. Colts 10–3. **Drive: 7 plays, 58 yards, 3:02.**
- IND – Adam Vinatieri 38-yard field goal, 3:01. Colts 13–3. **Drive: 12 plays, 58 yards, 6:23.**
- CIN – John Ross 3-yard pass from Andy Dalton (Randy Bullock kick), 1:44. Colts 13–10. **Drive: 5 plays, 75 yards, 1:17.**
- IND – Adam Vinatieri 51-yard field goal, 0:02. Colts 16–10. **Drive: 8 plays, 43 yards, 1:42.**

**Third quarter**

- IND – T. Y. Hilton 5-yard pass from Andrew Luck (Adam Vinatieri kick), 8:13. Colts 23–10. **Drive: 9 plays, 60 yards, 3:17.**
- CIN – A. J. Green 38-yard pass from Andy Dalton (Randy Bullock kick), 4:09. Colts 23–17. **Drive: 8 plays, 75 yards, 4:04.**

**Fourth quarter**

- CIN – Joe Mixon 1-yard run (Randy Bullock kick), 11:07. Bengals 24–23. **Drive: 7 plays, 55 yards, 4:05.**
- CIN – Randy Bullock 39-yard field goal, 3:57. Bengals 27–23. **Drive: 11 plays, 58 yards, 5:56.**
- CIN – Clayton Fejedelem 83-yard fumble return (Randy Bullock kick), 0:24. Bengals 34–23. **Drive: 13 plays, 58 yards, 3:33.**

**Top passers**

- CIN – Andy Dalton – 21/28, 243 yards, 2 TD, INT
- IND – Andrew Luck – 39/53, 319 yards, 2 TD, INT

**Top rushers**

- CIN – Joe Mixon – 17 rushes, 95 yards, TD
- IND – Jordan Wilkins – 14 rushes, 40 yards

**Top receivers**

- CIN – A. J. Green – 6 receptions, 92 yards, TD
- IND – Jack Doyle – 8 receptions, 60 yards

Despite leading 23–10 in the second half, the Colts allowed the Bengals to come back and win 34–23. While driving late in the game, Jack Doyle lost a fumble that was returned 83 yards for a touchdown, sealing the win for Cincinnati.

The loss snapped the Colts’ eight-game home winning streak against the Bengals and marked their first home defeat to them since the 1997 season.

==== Week 2: at Washington Redskins ====
Week Two: Indianapolis Colts at Washington Redskins – Game summary

Quarter	1	2	3	4	Total
**Colts**	7	7	0	7	**21**
Redskins	0	3	3	3	**9**

at FedEx Field, Landover, Maryland

- Date: September 16
- Game time: 1:00 p.m. EDT
- Game weather: Cloudy, 71 °F (22 °C)
- Game attendance: 57,013
- Referee: Clete Blakeman
- TV announcers (CBS): Spero Dedes and Adam Archuleta
- Recap, Gamebook

Game information

**First quarter**

- IND – Eric Ebron 7-yard pass from Andrew Luck (Adam Vinatieri kick), 9:25. Colts 7–0. **Drive: 11 plays, 75 yards, 5:35.**

**Second quarter**

- WAS – Dustin Hopkins 49-yard field goal, 11:12. Colts 7–3. **Drive: 5 plays, 27 yards, 1:57.**
- IND – Nyheim Hines 8-yard run (Adam Vinatieri kick), 6:51. Colts 14–3. **Drive: 8 plays, 75 yards, 4:21.**

**Third quarter**

- WAS – Dustin Hopkins 27-yard field goal, 5:40. Colts 14–6. **Drive: 7 plays, 20 yards, 3:37.**

**Fourth quarter**

- WAS – Dustin Hopkins 49-yard field goal, 13:28. Colts 14–9. **Drive: 11 plays, 42 yards, 6:07.**
- IND – T. Y. Hilton 3-yard pass from Andrew Luck (Adam Vinatieri kick), 7:32. Colts 21–9. **Drive: 13 plays, 75 yards, 5:56.**

**Top passers**

- IND – Andrew Luck – 21/31, 179 yards, 2 TD, 2 INT
- WAS – Alex Smith – 33/46, 292 yards

**Top rushers**

- IND – Jordan Wilkins – 10 rushes, 61 yards
- WAS – Jamison Crowder – 2 rushes, 29 yards

**Top receivers**

- IND – T. Y. Hilton – 11 receptions, 83 yards, TD
- WAS – Chris Thompson – 13 receptions, 92 yards

With the win, the Colts evened their record at 1-1.

==== Week 3: at Philadelphia Eagles ====
Week Three: Indianapolis Colts at Philadelphia Eagles – Game summary

Quarter	1	2	3	4	Total
Colts	7	0	6	3	**16**
**Eagles**	7	3	3	7	**20**

at Lincoln Financial Field, Philadelphia, Pennsylvania

- Date: September 23
- Game time: 1:00 p.m. EDT
- Game weather: Rain, 61 °F (16 °C)
- Game attendance: 69,696
- Referee: Clay Martin
- TV announcers (Fox): Chris Myers, Daryl Johnston and Laura Okmin
- Recap, Gamebook

Game information

**First quarter**

- PHI – Dallas Goedert 13-yard pass from Carson Wentz (Jake Elliott kick), 7:10. Eagles 7–0. **Drive: 12 plays, 79 yards, 5:11.**
- IND – Ryan Grant 5-yard pass from Andrew Luck (Adam Vinatieri kick), 0:24. Tied 7–7. **Drive: 6 plays, 55 yards, 1:52.**

**Second quarter**

- PHI – Jake Elliott 33-yard field goal, 3:05. Eagles 10–7. **Drive: 11 plays, 75 yards, 6:40.**

**Third quarter**

- IND – Adam Vinatieri 35-yard field goal, 9:41. Tied 10–10. **Drive: 9 plays, 48 yards, 3:35.**
- IND – Adam Vinatieri 31-yard field goal, 8:23. Colts 13–10. **Drive: 4 plays, 4 yards, 1:07.**
- PHI – Jake Elliott 24-yard field goal, 2:50. Tied 13–13. **Drive: 13 plays, 75 yards, 5:33.**

**Fourth quarter**

- IND – Adam Vinatieri 28-yard field goal, 14:20. Colts 16–13. **Drive: 4 plays, 3 yards, 1:00.**
- PHI – Wendell Smallwood 4-yard run (Jake Elliott kick), 3:02. Eagles 20–16. **Drive: 17 plays, 75 yards, 11:18.**

**Top passers**

- IND – Andrew Luck – 25/40, 164 yards, TD
- PHI – Carson Wentz – 25/37, 255 yards, TD, INT

**Top rushers**

- IND – Andrew Luck – 1 rushes, 33 yards
- PHI – Corey Clement – 10 rushes, 56 yards

**Top receivers**

- IND – T. Y. Hilton – 5 receptions, 50 yards
- PHI – Dallas Goedert – 7 receptions, 73 yards, TD

In a rain-filled affair, the Colts were unable to nurse a late lead, as they lost to the defending champion Eagles 20-16 and fell to 1–2.

==== Week 4: vs. Houston Texans ====
Week Four: Houston Texans at Indianapolis Colts – Game summary

Quarter	1	2	3	4	OT	Total
**Texans**	14	7	7	3	6	**37**
Colts	7	3	7	14	3	**34**

at Lucas Oil Stadium, Indianapolis, Indiana

- Date: September 30
- Game time: 1:00 p.m. EDT
- Game weather: Mostly sunny, 73 °F (23 °C) (retractable roof open)
- Game attendance: 57,716
- Referee: Carl Cheffers
- TV announcers (CBS): Spero Dedes and Adam Archuleta
- Recap, Gamebook

Game information

**First quarter**

- IND – Zach Pascal 4-yard pass from Andrew Luck (Adam Vinatieri kick), 11:17. Colts 7–0. **Drive: 7 plays, 75 yards, 3:43.**
- HOU – Jadeveon Clowney fumble recovery in the end zone (Kaʻimi Fairbairn kick), 5:19. Tied 7–7.
- HOU – Will Fuller 3-yard pass from Deshaun Watson (Kaʻimi Fairbairn kick), 1:45. Texans 14–7. **Drive: 5 plays, 52 yards, 1:27.**

**Second quarter**

- HOU – DeAndre Hopkins 5-yard pass from Deshaun Watson (Kaʻimi Fairbairn kick), 1:08. Texans 21–7. **Drive: 2 plays, 8 yards, 0:39.**
- IND – Adam Vinatieri 42-yard field goal, 0:02. Texans 21–10. **Drive: 6 plays, 46 yards, 1:06.**

**Third quarter**

- HOU – Deshaun Watson 5-yard run (Kaʻimi Fairbairn kick), 6:39. Texans 28–10. **Drive: 15 plays, 79 yards, 8:21.**
- IND – Nyheim Hines 14-yard pass from Andrew Luck (Adam Vinatieri kick), 5:21. Texans 28–17. **Drive: 5 plays, 75 yards, 1:25.**

**Fourth quarter**

- IND – Eric Ebron 5-yard pass from Andrew Luck (pass failed), 7:41. Texans 28–23. **Drive: 13 plays, 73 yards, 6:22.**
- HOU – Kaʻimi Fairbairn 40-yard field goal, 3:02. Texans 31–23. **Drive: 10 plays, 54 yards, 4:39.**
- IND – Nyheim Hines 9-yard pass from Andrew Luck (Andrew Luck–Chester Rogers pass), 0:45. Tied 31–31. **Drive: 9 plays, 85 yards, 2:13.**

**Overtime**

- IND – Adam Vinatieri 44-yard field goal, 6:00. Colts 34–31. **Drive: 13 plays, 50 yards, 4:00.**
- HOU – Kaʻimi Fairbairn 29-yard field goal, 1:50. Tied 34–34. **Drive: 12 plays, 59 yards, 4:10.**
- HOU – Kaʻimi Fairbairn 37-yard field goal, 0:00. Texans 37–34. **Drive: 3 plays, 24 yards, 0:21.**

**Top passers**

- HOU – Deshaun Watson – 29/42, 375 yards, 2 TD, INT
- IND – Andrew Luck – 40/62, 464 yards, 4 TD

**Top rushers**

- HOU – Lamar Miller – 15 rushes, 49 yards
- IND – Jordan Wilkins – 8 rushes, 16 yards

**Top receivers**

- HOU – DeAndre Hopkins – 10 receptions, 169 yards, TD
- IND – T. Y. Hilton – 4 receptions, 115 yards

In a shootout, the Texans were able to pull it out in overtime, winning 37–34, as the Colts fell to 1–3.

==== Week 5: at New England Patriots ====
Week Five: Indianapolis Colts at New England Patriots – Game summary

Quarter	1	2	3	4	Total
Colts	0	3	7	14	**24**
**Patriots**	7	17	0	14	**38**

at Gillette Stadium, Foxborough, Massachusetts

- Date: October 4
- Game time: 8:20 p.m. EDT
- Game weather: Mostly cloudy, 66 °F (19 °C)
- Game attendance: 65,878
- Referee: Shawn Hochuli
- TV announcers (Fox/NFLN): Joe Buck, Troy Aikman, Erin Andrews and Kristina Pink; Amazon Video: Hannah Storm and Andrea Kremer
- Recap, Gamebook

Game information

**First quarter**

- NE – Cordarrelle Patterson 1-yard pass from Tom Brady (Stephen Gostkowski kick), 8:58. Patriots 7–0. **Drive: 12 plays, 75 yards, 6:02.**

**Second quarter**

- NE – Tom Brady 1-yard run (Stephen Gostkowski kick), 12:14. Patriots 14–0. **Drive: 8 plays, 72 yards, 3:44.**
- IND – Adam Vinatieri 54-yard field goal, 8:49. Patriots 14–3. **Drive: 9 plays, 39 yards, 3:25.**
- NE – James White 6-yard pass from Tom Brady (Stephen Gostkowski kick), 1:34. Patriots 21–3. **Drive: 11 plays, 68 yards, 3:49.**
- NE – Stephen Gostkowski 45-yard field goal, 0:13. Patriots 24–3. **Drive: 5 plays, 22 yards, 0:25.**

**Third quarter**

- IND – Eric Ebron 14-yard pass from Andrew Luck (Adam Vinatieri kick), 9:48. Patriots 24–10. **Drive: 4 plays, 35 yards, 1:56.**

**Fourth quarter**

- IND – Erik Swoope 13-yard pass from Andrew Luck (Adam Vinatieri kick), 12:48. Patriots 24–17. **Drive: 10 plays, 80 yards, 4:38.**
- NE – Josh Gordon 34-yard pass from Tom Brady (Stephen Gostkowski kick), 9:19. Patriots 31–17. **Drive: 6 plays, 75 yards, 3:29.**
- NE – Sony Michel 34-yard run (Stephen Gostkowski kick), 7:08. Patriots 38–17. **Drive: 1 play, 34 yards, 0:07.**
- IND – Eric Ebron 1-yard pass from Andrew Luck (Adam Vinatieri kick), 1:11. Patriots 38–24. **Drive: 6 plays, 60 yards, 1:52.**

**Top passers**

- IND – Andrew Luck – 38/59, 365 yards, 3 TD, 2 INT
- NE – Tom Brady – 34/44, 341 yards, 3 TD, 2 INT

**Top rushers**

- IND – Nyheim Hines – 15 rushes, 45 yards
- NE – Sony Michel – 18 rushes, 98 yards, TD

**Top receivers**

- IND – Eric Ebron – 9 receptions, 105 yards, 2 TD
- NE – James White – 10 receptions, 77 yards, TD

The Colts were seeking their first road win over the Patriots since their 2006 Super Bowl-winning season.

==== Week 6: at New York Jets ====
Week Six: Indianapolis Colts at New York Jets – Game summary

Quarter	1	2	3	4	Total
Colts	7	6	7	14	**34**
**Jets**	10	13	10	9	**42**

at MetLife Stadium, East Rutherford, New Jersey

- Date: October 14
- Game time: 1:00 p.m. EDT
- Game weather: Cloudy, 60 °F (16 °C)
- Game attendance: 77,982
- Referee: Alex Kemp
- TV announcers (CBS): Greg Gumbel, Trent Green, Bruce Arians and Melanie Collins
- Recap, Gamebook

Game information

**First quarter**

- NYJ – Morris Claiborne 17-yard interception return (Jason Myers kick), 14:48. Jets 7–0.
- IND – Marcus Johnson 34-yard pass from Andrew Luck (Adam Vinatieri kick), 12:16. Tied 7–7. **Drive: 5 plays, 75 yards, 2:32.**
- NYJ – Jason Myers 30-yard field goal, 4:33. Jets 10–7. **Drive: 13 plays, 69 yards, 7:43.**

**Second quarter**

- IND – Adam Vinatieri 21-yard field goal, 13:25. Tied 10–10. **Drive: 8 plays, 32 yards, 2:22.**
- IND – Adam Vinatieri 31-yard field goal, 11:24. Colts 13–10. **Drive: 6 plays, 28 yards, 1:51.**
- NYJ – Terrelle Pryor 7-yard pass from Sam Darnold (Jason Myers kick), 2:32. Jets 17–13. **Drive: 8 plays, 43 yards, 4:47.**
- NYJ – Jason Myers 48-yard field goal, 1:25. Jets 20–13. **Drive: 4 plays, -3 yards, 0:29.**
- NYJ – Jason Myers 32-yard field goal, 0:00. Jets 23–13. **Drive: 6 plays, 58 yards, 0:42.**

**Third quarter**

- NYJ – Chris Herndon 32-yard pass from Sam Darnold (Jason Myers kick), 12:03. Jets 30–13. **Drive: 5 plays, 72 yards, 2:57.**
- IND – Eric Ebron 18-yard pass from Andrew Luck (Adam Vinatieri kick), 8:44. Jets 30–20. **Drive: 6 plays, 75 yards, 3:19.**
- NYJ – Jason Myers 37-yard field goal, 3:53. Jets 33–20. **Drive: 9 plays, 56 yards, 4:51.**

**Fourth quarter**

- IND – Erik Swoope 2-yard pass from Andrew Luck (Adam Vinatieri kick), 14:52. Jets 33–27. **Drive: 13 plays, 75 yards, 4:01.**
- NYJ – Jason Myers 45-yard field goal, 9:40. Jets 36–27. **Drive: 10 plays, 48 yards, 5:12.**
- NYJ – Jason Myers 37-yard field goal, 5:55. Jets 39–27. **Drive: 4 plays, 6 yards, 2:04.**
- NYJ – Jason Myers 45-yard field goal, 3:19. Jets 42–27. **Drive: 6 plays, 4 yards, 1:58.**
- IND – Chester Rogers 17-yard pass from Andrew Luck (Adam Vinatieri kick), 1:51. Jets 42–34. **Drive: 8 plays, 63 yards, 1:28.**

**Top passers**

- IND – Andrew Luck - 23/43, 301 yards, 4 TD, 3 INT
- NYJ – Sam Darnold - 24/30, 280 yards, 2 TD, INT

**Top rushers**

- IND – Marlon Mack - 11 rushes, 89 yards
- NYJ – Bilal Powell - 16 rushes, 59 yards

**Top receivers**

- IND – Eric Ebron - 4 receptions, 71 yards, TD
- NYJ – Jermaine Kearse - 9 receptions, 94 yards

==== Week 7: vs. Buffalo Bills ====
Week Seven: Buffalo Bills at Indianapolis Colts – Game summary

Quarter	1	2	3	4	Total
Bills	0	0	5	0	**5**
**Colts**	0	24	0	13	**37**

at Lucas Oil Stadium, Indianapolis, Indiana

- Date: October 21
- Game time: 1:00 p.m. EDT
- Game weather: None (retractable roof closed)
- Game attendance: 56,848
- Referee: Brad Allen
- TV announcers (CBS): Spero Dedes and Adam Archuleta
- Recap, Gamebook

Game information

**First quarter**

- No scoring plays.

**Second quarter**

- IND – Erik Swoope 17-yard pass from Andrew Luck (kick failed), 13:38. Colts 6–0. **Drive: 13 plays, 75 yards, 6:53.**
- IND – Marlon Mack 29-yard pass from Andrew Luck (Marlon Mack run), 9:35. Colts 14–0. **Drive: 3 plays, 74 yards, 1:29.**
- IND – T. Y. Hilton 5-yard pass from Andrew Luck (Adam Vinatieri kick), 1:48. Colts 21–0. **Drive: 9 plays, 82 yards, 5:35.**
- IND – Adam Vinatieri 36-yard field goal, 0:03. Colts 24–0. **Drive: 3 plays, 14 yards, 0:13.**

**Third quarter**

- BUF – Steven Hauschka 34-yard field goal, 7:46. Colts 24–3. **Drive: 12 plays, 56 yards, 7:18.**
- BUF – Andrew Luck fumble, ball goes out of bounds in IND end zone for a safety, 0:25. Colts 24–5.

**Fourth quarter**

- IND – T. Y. Hilton 1-yard pass from Andrew Luck (Adam Vinatieri kick), 13:18. Colts 31–5. **Drive: 3 plays, 2 yards, 1:31.**
- IND – Marlon Mack 20-yard run (kick failed), 5:32. Colts 37–5. **Drive: 1 play, 20 yards, 0:06.**

**Top passers**

- BUF – Derek Anderson – 20/31, 175 yards, 3 INT
- IND – Andrew Luck – 17/23, 156 yards, 4 TD

**Top rushers**

- BUF – Chris Ivory – 16 rushes, 81 yards
- IND – Marlon Mack – 19 rushes, 126 yards, TD

**Top receivers**

- BUF – Kelvin Benjamin – 4 receptions, 71 yards
- IND – Chester Rogers – 4 receptions, 40 yards

==== Week 8: at Oakland Raiders ====
Week Eight: Indianapolis Colts at Oakland Raiders – Game summary

Quarter	1	2	3	4	Total
**Colts**	10	3	8	21	**42**
Raiders	0	14	14	0	**28**

at Oakland–Alameda County Coliseum, Oakland, California

- Date: October 28
- Game time: 4:05 p.m. EDT/1:05 p.m. PDT
- Game weather: Sunny, 69 °F (21 °C)
- Game attendance: 54,372
- Referee: John Parry
- TV announcers (CBS): Andrew Catalon, James Lofton and Amanda Balionis
- Recap, Gamebook

Game information

**First quarter**

- IND – Mo Alie-Cox 26-yard pass from Andrew Luck (Adam Vinatieri kick), 8:21. Colts 7–0. **Drive: 11 plays, 75 yards, 6:39.**
- IND – Adam Vinatieri 26-yard field goal, 0:00. Colts 10–0. **Drive: 13 plays, 70 yards, 7:17.**

**Second quarter**

- OAK – Seth Roberts 31-yard pass from Derek Carr (Daniel Carlson kick), 11:56. Colts 10–7. **Drive: 6 plays, 75 yards, 3:04.**
- OAK – Jared Cook 25-yard pass from Derek Carr (Daniel Carlson kick), 6:13. Raiders 14–10. **Drive: 7 plays, 79 yards, 4:28.**
- IND – Adam Vinatieri 25-yard field goal, 0:26. Raiders 14–13. **Drive: 16 plays, 68 yards, 5:47.**

**Third quarter**

- OAK – Derek Carr 1-yard run (Daniel Carlson kick), 9:49. Raiders 21–13. **Drive: 8 plays, 75 yards, 5:11.**
- IND – Eric Ebron 20-yard pass from Andrew Luck (Andrew Luck-Chester Rogers pass), 7:39. Tied 21–21. **Drive: 4 plays, 75 yards, 2:10.**
- OAK – Brandon LaFell 6-yard pass from Derek Carr (Daniel Carlson kick), 1:01. Raiders 28–21. **Drive: 11 plays, 75 yards, 6:38.**

**Fourth quarter**

- IND – Marlon Mack 4-yard run (Adam Vinatieri kick), 10:47. Tied 28–28. **Drive: 12 plays, 75 yards, 5:14.**
- IND – Jack Doyle 10-yard pass from Andrew Luck (Adam Vinatieri kick), 5:28. Colts 35–28. **Drive: 6 plays, 57 yards, 3:52.**
- IND – Marlon Mack 1-yard run (Adam Vinatieri kick), 2:55. Colts 42–28. **Drive: 5 plays, 27 yards, 2:21.**

**Top passers**

- IND – Andrew Luck – 22/31, 239 yards, 3 TD
- OAK – Derek Carr – 21/28, 244 yards, 3 TD

**Top rushers**

- IND – Marlon Mack – 25 rushes, 132 yards, 2 TD
- OAK – Doug Martin – 13 rushes, 72 yards

**Top receivers**

- IND – Jack Doyle – 6 receptions, 70 yards, TD
- OAK – Jared Cook – 4 receptions, 74 yards, TD

==== Week 10: vs. Jacksonville Jaguars ====
Week Ten: Jacksonville Jaguars at Indianapolis Colts – Game summary

Quarter	1	2	3	4	Total
Jaguars	7	9	7	3	**26**
**Colts**	14	15	0	0	**29**

at Lucas Oil Stadium, Indianapolis, Indiana

- Date: November 11
- Game time: 1:00 p.m. EST
- Game weather: None (retractable roof closed)
- Game attendance: 57,473
- Referee: Jerome Boger
- TV announcers (CBS): Spero Dedes and Adam Archuleta
- Recap, Gamebook

Game information

**First quarter**

- IND – Eric Ebron 53-yard pass from Andrew Luck (Adam Vinatieri kick), 11:26. Colts 7–0. **Drive: 7 plays, 75 yards, 3:34.**
- JAX – Donte Moncrief 80-yard pass from Blake Bortles (Josh Lambo kick), 2:58. Tied 7–7. **Drive: 5 plays, 97 yards, 2:42.**
- IND – Eric Ebron 2-yard run (Adam Vinatieri kick), 0:00. Colts 14–7. **Drive: 6 plays, 70 yards, 2:58.**

**Second quarter**

- IND – Eric Ebron 12-yard pass from Andrew Luck (Adam Vinatieri kick), 9:19. Colts 21–7. **Drive: 7 plays, 86 yards, 2:52.**
- JAX – Leonard Fournette 1-yard run (kick blocked), 5:53. Colts 21–13. **Drive: 6 plays, 54 yards, 3:26.**
- IND – Mo Alie-Cox 1-yard pass from Andrew Luck (Marlon Mack run), 1:46. Colts 29–13. **Drive: 10 plays, 50 yards, 4:07.**
- JAX – Josh Lambo 28-yard field goal, 0:05. Colts 29–16. **Drive: 10 plays, 50 yards, 1:41.**

**Third quarter**

- JAX – Leonard Fournette 1-yard pass from Blake Bortles (Josh Lambo kick), 6:25. Colts 29–23. **Drive: 17 plays, 75 yards, 8:35.**

**Fourth quarter**

- JAX – Josh Lambo 55-yard field goal, 4:03. Colts 29–26. **Drive: 8 plays, 27 yards, 4:15.**

**Top passers**

- JAX – Blake Bortles – 26/38, 320 yards, 2 TD
- IND – Andrew Luck – 21/29, 285 yards, 3 TD, INT

**Top rushers**

- JAX – Leonard Fournette – 24 rushes, 53 yards
- IND – Jordan Wilkins – 1 rush, 53 yards

**Top receivers**

- JAX – Leonard Fournette – 5 receptions, 56 yards, TD
- IND – T. Y. Hilton – 3 receptions, 77 yards

==== Week 11: vs. Tennessee Titans ====
Week Eleven: Tennessee Titans at Indianapolis Colts – Game summary

Quarter	1	2	3	4	Total
Titans	0	3	0	7	**10**
**Colts**	7	17	7	7	**38**

at Lucas Oil Stadium, Indianapolis, Indiana

- Date: November 18
- Game time: 1:00 p.m. EST
- Game weather: None (retractable roof closed)
- Game attendance: 57,401
- Referee: John Hussey
- TV announcers (CBS): Andrew Catalon and James Lofton
- Recap, Gamebook

Game information

**First quarter**

- IND – Marlon Mack 1-yard rush (Adam Vinatieri kick), 1:15. Colts 7–0. **Drive: 7 plays, 33 yards, 3:36.**

**Second quarter**

- IND – Adam Vinatieri 22-yard field goal, 10:59. Colts 10–0. **Drive: 8 plays, 54 yards, 2:54.**
- IND – T. Y. Hilton 68-yard pass from Andrew Luck (Adam Vinatieri kick), 7:26. Colts 17–0. **Drive: 4 plays, 87 yards, 1:35.**
- IND – Jordan Wilkins 18-yard rush (Adam Vinatieri kick), 2:29. Colts 24–0. **Drive: 5 plays, 85 yards, 2:54.**
- TEN – Ryan Succop 42-yard field goal, 0:00. Colts 24–3. **Drive: 11 plays, 51 yards, 2:29.**

**Third quarter**

- IND – T. Y. Hilton 14-yard pass from Andrew Luck (Adam Vinatieri kick), 7:24. Colts 31–3. **Drive: 3 plays, 21 yards, 0:54.**

**Fourth quarter**

- IND – Dontrelle Inman 7-yard pass from Andrew Luck (Adam Vinatieri kick), 12:12. Colts 38–3. **Drive: 13 plays, 85 yards, 7:33.**
- TEN – Tajae Sharpe 1-yard pass from Blaine Gabbert (Ryan Succop kick), 1:49. Colts 38–10. **Drive: 12 plays, 94 yards, 6:11.**

**Top passers**

- TEN – Blaine Gabbert – 11/16, 118 yards, TD, INT
- IND – Andrew Luck – 23/29, 297 yards, 3 TD

**Top rushers**

- TEN – Derrick Henry – 9 rushes, 46 yards
- IND – Marlon Mack – 16 rushes, 61 yards, TD

**Top receivers**

- TEN – Jonnu Smith – 6 receptions, 44 yards
- IND – T. Y. Hilton – 9 receptions, 155 yards, 2 TD

==== Week 12: vs. Miami Dolphins ====
Week Twelve: Miami Dolphins at Indianapolis Colts – Game summary

Quarter	1	2	3	4	Total
Dolphins	7	7	3	7	**24**
**Colts**	7	7	0	13	**27**

at Lucas Oil Stadium, Indianapolis, Indiana

- Date: November 25
- Game time: 4:25 p.m. EST
- Game weather: None (retractable roof closed)
- Game attendance: 57,069
- Referee: Clete Blakeman
- TV announcers (CBS): Greg Gumbel, Trent Green, Bruce Arians and Melanie Collins
- Recap, Gamebook

Game information

**First quarter**

- MIA – Kenyan Drake 33-yard pass from Ryan Tannehill (Jason Sanders kick), 12:22. Dolphins 7–0. **Drive: 6 plays, 75 yards, 2:38.**
- IND – Eric Ebron 14-yard pass from Andrew Luck (Adam Vinatieri kick), 9:37. Tied 7–7. **Drive: 5 plays, 75 yards, 2:45.**

**Second quarter**

- IND – Jack Doyle 1-yard pass from Andrew Luck (Adam Vinatieri kick), 1:44. Colts 14–7. **Drive: 13 plays, 73 yards, 5:49.**
- MIA – Leonte Carroo 74-yard pass from Ryan Tannehill (Jason Sanders kick), 1:00. Tied 14–14. **Drive: 2 plays, 75 yards, 0:44.**

**Third quarter**

- MIA – Jason Sanders 29-yard field goal, 9:14. Dolphins 17–14. **Drive: 8 plays, 31 yards, 4:18.**

**Fourth quarter**

- MIA – Kenyan Drake 14-yard rush (Jason Sanders kick), 13:36. Dolphins 24–14. **Drive: 9 plays, 62 yards, 4:55.**
- IND – Adam Vinatieri 46-yard field goal, 8:26. Dolphins 24–17. **Drive: 10 plays, 47 yards, 5:10.**
- IND – Eric Ebron 12-yard pass from Andrew Luck (Adam Vinatieri kick), 4:25. Tied 24–24. **Drive: 7 plays, 89 yards, 3:18.**
- IND – Adam Vinatieri 32-yard field goal, 0:00. Colts 27–24. **Drive: 7 plays, 44 yards, 2:38.**

**Top passers**

- MIA – Ryan Tannehill – 17/25, 204 yards, 2 TD
- IND – Andrew Luck – 30/37, 343 yards, 3 TD, 2 INT

**Top rushers**

- MIA – Frank Gore – 14 rushes, 67 yards
- IND – Marlon Mack – 15 rushes, 85 yards

**Top receivers**

- MIA – Kenyan Drake – 5 receptions, 64 yards, TD
- IND – T. Y. Hilton – 7 receptions, 125 yards

==== Week 13: at Jacksonville Jaguars ====
Week Thirteen: Indianapolis Colts at Jacksonville Jaguars – Game summary

Quarter	1	2	3	4	Total
Colts	0	0	0	0	**0**
**Jaguars**	0	3	0	3	**6**

at TIAA Bank Field, Jacksonville, Florida

- Date: December 2
- Game time: 1:00 p.m. EST
- Game weather: Cloudy, 78 °F (26 °C)
- Game attendance: 67,030
- Referee: Alex Kemp
- TV announcers (CBS): Tom McCarthy and Steve Beuerlein
- Recap, Gamebook

Game information

**First quarter**

- No scoring plays.

**Second quarter**

- JAX – Josh Lambo 30-yard field goal, 2:03. Jaguars 3–0. **Drive: 13 plays, 43 yards, 6:49.**

**Third quarter**

- No scoring plays.

**Fourth quarter**

- JAX – Josh Lambo 37-yard field goal, 11:42. Jaguars 6–0. **Drive: 10 plays, 49 yards, 5:48.**

**Top passers**

- IND – Andrew Luck – 33/52, 248 yards, INT
- JAX – Cody Kessler – 18/24, 150 yards

**Top rushers**

- IND – Marlon Mack – 8 rushes, 27 yards
- JAX – Carlos Hyde – 13 rushes, 36 yards

**Top receivers**

- IND – Eric Ebron – 10 receptions, 81 yards
- JAX – T.J. Yeldon – 7 receptions, 49 yards

==== Week 14: at Houston Texans ====
Week Fourteen: Indianapolis Colts at Houston Texans – Game summary

Quarter	1	2	3	4	Total
**Colts**	0	17	7	0	**24**
Texans	7	0	7	7	**21**

at NRG Stadium, Houston, Texas

- Date: December 9
- Game time: 1:00 p.m. EST/12:00 p.m. CST
- Game weather: None (retractable roof closed)
- Game attendance: 71,814
- Referee: Bill Vinovich
- TV announcers (CBS): Kevin Harlan, Rich Gannon and Steve Tasker
- Recap, Gamebook

Game information

**First quarter**

- HOU – Alfred Blue 3-yard run (Kaʻimi Fairbairn kick), 2:26. Texans 7–0. **Drive: 10 plays, 82 yards, 4:09.**

**Second quarter**

- IND – Marlon Mack 4-yard run (Adam Vinatieri kick), 6:33. Tied 7–7. **Drive: 2 plays, 64 yards, 0:46.**
- IND – Eric Ebron 14-yard pass from Andrew Luck (Adam Vinatieri kick), 2:57. Colts 14–7. **Drive: 5 plays, 66 yards, 2:16.**
- IND – Adam Vinatieri 54-yard field goal, 0:04. Colts 17–7. **Drive: 10 plays, 53 yards, 1:14.**

**Third quarter**

- HOU – Lamar Miller 1-yard run (Kaʻimi Fairbairn kick), 7:38. Colts 17–14. **Drive: 16 plays, 75 yards, 7:22.**
- IND – Zach Pascal 12-yard pass from Andrew Luck (Adam Vinatieri kick), 3:51. Colts 24–14. **Drive: 8 plays, 75 yards, 3:47.**

**Fourth quarter**

- HOU – DeAndre Hopkins 7-yard pass from Deshaun Watson (Kaʻimi Fairbairn kick), 2:37. Colts 24–21. **Drive: 6 plays, 70 yards, 1:53.**

**Top passers**

- IND – Andrew Luck – 27/41, 399 yards, 2 TD, INT
- HOU – Deshaun Watson – 27/38, 267 yards, TD

**Top rushers**

- IND – Marlon Mack – 14 rushes, 33 yards, TD
- HOU – Deshaun Watson – 5 rushes, 35 yards

**Top receivers**

- IND – T. Y. Hilton – 9 receptions, 199 yards
- HOU – Ryan Griffin – 5 receptions, 80 yards

==== Week 15: vs. Dallas Cowboys ====
Week Fifteen: Dallas Cowboys at Indianapolis Colts – Game summary

Quarter	1	2	3	4	Total
Cowboys	0	0	0	0	**0**
**Colts**	7	3	10	3	**23**

at Lucas Oil Stadium, Indianapolis, Indiana

- Date: December 16
- Game time: 1:00 p.m. EST
- Game weather: None (retractable roof closed)
- Game attendance: 66,654
- Referee: Carl Cheffers
- TV announcers (Fox): Kevin Burkhardt, Charles Davis and Pam Oliver
- Recap, Gamebook

Game information

**First quarter**

- IND – Marlon Mack 1-yard rush (Adam Vinatieri kick), 6:09. Colts 7–0. **Drive: 8 plays, 44 yards, 3:46.**

**Second quarter**

- IND – Adam Vinatieri 43-yard field goal, 0:00. Colts 10–0. **Drive: 11 plays, 59 yards, 1:53.**

**Third quarter**

- IND – Marlon Mack 6-yard rush (Adam Vinatieri kick), 11:23. Colts 17–0. **Drive: 8 plays, 75 yards, 3:37.**
- IND – Adam Vinatieri 44-yard field goal, 1:36. Colts 20–0. **Drive: 10 plays, 63 yards, 6:09.**

**Fourth quarter**

- IND – Adam Vinatieri 23-yard field goal, 6:57. Colts 23–0. **Drive: 12 plays, 55 yards, 7:59.**

**Top passers**

- DAL – Dak Prescott – 24/39, 206 yards, INT
- IND – Andrew Luck – 16/27, 192 yards

**Top rushers**

- DAL – Ezekiel Elliott – 18 rushes, 87 yards
- IND – Marlon Mack – 27 rushes, 139 yards, 2 TD

**Top receivers**

- DAL – Blake Jarwin – 4 receptions, 45 yards
- IND – T. Y. Hilton – 5 receptions, 85 yards

==== Week 16: vs. New York Giants ====
Week Sixteen: New York Giants at Indianapolis Colts – Game summary

Quarter	1	2	3	4	Total
Giants	14	3	7	3	**27**
**Colts**	0	7	14	7	**28**

at Lucas Oil Stadium, Indianapolis, Indiana

- Date: December 23
- Game time: 1:00 p.m. EST
- Game weather: None (retractable roof closed)
- Game attendance: 61,738
- Referee: Brad Allen
- TV announcers (CBS): Kevin Harlan, Rich Gannon and Steve Tasker
- Recap, Gamebook

Game information

**First quarter**

- NYG – Saquon Barkley 1-yard rush (Aldrick Rosas kick), 8:11. Giants 7–0. **Drive: 11 plays, 45 yards, 5:54.**
- NYG – Scott Simonson 3-yard pass from Eli Manning (Aldrick Rosas kick), 1:41. Giants 14–0. **Drive: 9 plays, 87 yards, 4:29.**

**Second quarter**

- IND – Nyheim Hines 1-yard rush (Adam Vinatieri kick), 4:09. Giants 14–7. **Drive: 12 plays, 78 yards, 6:48.**
- NYG – Aldrick Rosas 40-yard field goal, 1:10. Giants 17–7. **Drive: 9 plays, 53 yards, 2:59.**

**Third quarter**

- IND – Dontrelle Inman 2-yard pass from Andrew Luck (Adam Vinatieri kick), 7:38. Giants 17–14. **Drive: 7 plays, 85 yards, 4:11.**
- NYG – Eli Manning 1-yard rush (Aldrick Rosas kick), 3:42. Giants 24–14. **Drive: 8 plays, 85 yards, 3:56.**
- IND – Marlon Mack 3-yard rush (Adam Vinatieri kick), 0:32. Giants 24–21. **Drive: 7 plays, 74 yards, 3:10.**

**Fourth quarter**

- NYG – Aldrick Rosas 27-yard field goal, 9:20. Giants 27–21. **Drive: 12 plays, 66 yards, 6:12.**
- IND – Chester Rogers 1-yard pass from Andrew Luck (Adam Vinatieri kick), 0:55. Colts 28–27. **Drive: 8 plays, 53 yards, 2:48.**

**Top passers**

- NYG – Eli Manning – 25/33, 309 yards, TD, INT
- IND – Andrew Luck – 21/47, 357 yards, 2 TD, INT

**Top rushers**

- NYG – Saquon Barkley – 21 rushes, 43 yards, TD
- IND – Marlon Mack – 12 rushes, 34 yards, TD

**Top receivers**

- NYG – Sterling Shepard – 6 receptions, 113 yards
- IND – T. Y. Hilton – 7 receptions, 138 yards

==== Week 17: at Tennessee Titans ====
Week Seventeen: Indianapolis Colts at Tennessee Titans – Game summary

Quarter	1	2	3	4	Total
**Colts**	7	10	7	9	**33**
Titans	0	10	7	0	**17**

at Nissan Stadium, Nashville, Tennessee

- Date: December 30
- Game time: 8:20 p.m. EST/7:20 p.m. CST
- Game weather: Clear, 53 °F (12 °C)
- Game attendance: 68,978
- Referee: Walt Anderson
- TV announcers (NBC): Al Michaels, Cris Collinsworth and Michele Tafoya
- Recap, Gamebook

Game information

**First quarter**

- IND – Dontrelle Inman 11-yard pass from Andrew Luck (Adam Vinatieri kick), 6:39. Colts 7–0. **Drive: 12 plays, 92 yards, 6:46.**

**Second quarter**

- IND – Eric Ebron 9-yard pass from Andrew Luck (Adam Vinatieri kick), 9:26. Colts 14–0. **Drive: 16 plays, 90 yards, 9:58.**
- TEN – Jayon Brown 22-yard interception return (Ryan Succop kick), 6:35. Colts 14–7.
- IND – Adam Vinatieri 53-yard field goal, 0:39. Colts 17–7. **Drive: 7 plays, 60 yards, 1:46.**
- TEN – Ryan Succop 38-yard field goal, 0:00. Colts 17–10. **Drive: 7 plays, 55 yards, 0:39.**

**Third quarter**

- IND – Ryan Hewitt 1-yard pass from Andrew Luck (Adam Vinatieri kick), 10:46. Colts 24–10. **Drive: 7 plays, 68 yards, 4:14.**
- TEN – Luke Stocker 22-yard pass from Blaine Gabbert (Ryan Succop kick), 1:47. Colts 24–17. **Drive: 2 plays, 55 yards, 0:36.**

**Fourth quarter**

- IND – Adam Vinatieri 25-yard field goal, 3:55. Colts 27–17. **Drive: 9 plays, 31 yards, 5:10.**
- IND – Marlon Mack 8-yard rush (kick failed), 2:24. Colts 33–17. **Drive: 1 plays, 8 yards, 0:04.**

**Top passers**

- IND – Andrew Luck – 24/35, 285 yards, 3 TD, INT
- TEN – Blaine Gabbert – 18/29, 165 yards, TD, 2 INT

**Top rushers**

- IND – Marlon Mack – 25 rushes, 119 yards, TD
- TEN – Derrick Henry – 16 rushes, 93 yards

**Top receivers**

- IND – Dontrelle Inman – 5 receptions, 77 yards, TD
- TEN – Corey Davis – 5 receptions, 48 yards

=== Standings ===
==== Division ====
AFC South
	W	L	T	PCT	DIV	CONF	PF	PA	STK
^{(3)} Houston Texans	11	5	0	.688	4–2	9–3	402	316	W1
^{(6)} Indianapolis Colts	10	6	0	.625	4–2	7–5	433	344	W4
Tennessee Titans	9	7	0	.563	3–3	5–7	310	303	L1
Jacksonville Jaguars	5	11	0	.313	1–5	4–8	245	316	L1

==== Conference ====
AFC
#	Team	Division	W	L	T	PCT	DIV	CONF	SOS	SOV	STK
**Division leaders**
1 (Note: Kansas City finished ahead of LA Chargers in the AFC West based on division record, claiming the No. 1 seed.)	Kansas City Chiefs	West	12	4	0	.750	5–1	10–2	.480	.401	W1
2 (Note: New England claimed the No. 2 seed over Houston based on head-to-head victory.)	New England Patriots	East	11	5	0	.688	5–1	8–4	.482	.494	W2
3	Houston Texans	South	11	5	0	.688	4–2	9–3	.471	.435	W1
4	Baltimore Ravens	North	10	6	0	.625	3–3	8–4	.496	.450	W3
**Wild Cards**
5	Los Angeles Chargers	West	12	4	0	.750	4–2	9–3	.477	.422	W1
6	Indianapolis Colts	South	10	6	0	.625	4–2	7–5	.465	.456	W4
**Did not qualify for the postseason**
7	Pittsburgh Steelers	North	9	6	1	.594	4–1–1	6–5–1	.504	.448	W1
8	Tennessee Titans	South	9	7	0	.563	3–3	5–7	.520	.465	L1
9	Cleveland Browns	North	7	8	1	.469	3–2–1	5–6–1	.516	.411	L1
10	Miami Dolphins	East	7	9	0	.438	4–2	6–6	.469	.446	L3
11 (Note: Denver finished ahead of Cincinnati and Buffalo based on strength of victory. Cincinnati finished ahead of Buffalo based on record vs. common opponents. Cincinnati's cumulative record against Baltimore, Indianapolis, the Los Angeles Chargers and Miami was 3–2, compared to Buffalo's 1–4 cumulative record against the same four teams.)	Denver Broncos	West	6	10	0	.375	2–4	4–8	.523	.464	L4
12	Cincinnati Bengals	North	6	10	0	.375	1–5	4–8	.535	.448	L2
13	Buffalo Bills	East	6	10	0	.375	2–4	4–8	.523	.411	W1
14	Jacksonville Jaguars	South	5	11	0	.313	1–5	4–8	.549	.463	L1
15 (Note: NY Jets finished ahead of Oakland based on strength of victory.)	New York Jets	East	4	12	0	.250	1–5	3–9	.506	.438	L3
16	Oakland Raiders	West	4	12	0	.250	1–5	3–9	.547	.406	L1
**Tiebreakers** (Note: When breaking ties for three or more teams under the NFL's rules, they are first broken within divisions, then comparing only the highest ranked remaining team from each division.)

== Postseason ==
=== Schedule ===
Round	Date	Opponent (seed)	Result	Record	Venue	Recap
Wild Card	January 5, 2019	at Houston Texans (3)	W 21–7	1–0	NRG Stadium	Recap
Divisional	January 12, 2019	at Kansas City Chiefs (1)	L 13–31	1–1	Arrowhead Stadium	Recap

=== Game summaries ===
==== AFC Wild Card Playoffs: at (3) Houston Texans ====
AFC Wild Card Playoffs: (6) Indianapolis Colts at (3) Houston Texans – Game summary

Quarter	1	2	3	4	Total
Colts	14	7	0	0	21
Texans	0	0	0	7	7

at NRG Stadium, Houston, Texas

- Date: January 5, 2019
- Game time: 4:35 p.m. EST/3:35 p.m. CST
- Game weather: None (retractable roof closed)
- Game attendance: 71,798
- Referee: Bill Vinovich
- TV announcers (ESPN/ABC): Joe Tessitore, Jason Witten, Booger McFarland and Lisa Salters
- Recap, Gamebook

Game information

First quarter

- IND – Eric Ebron 6-yard pass from Andrew Luck (Adam Vinatieri kick), 10:37. Colts 7–0. Drive: 9 plays, 75 yards, 4:28.
- IND – Marlon Mack 2-yard run (Adam Vinatieri kick), 4:08. Colts 14–0. Drive: 9 plays, 74 yards, 5:25.

Second quarter

- IND – Dontrelle Inman 18-yard pass from Andrew Luck (Adam Vinatieri kick), 6:29. Colts 21–0. Drive: 7 plays, 65 yards, 3:23.

Third quarter

- No scoring plays.

Fourth quarter

- HOU – Keke Coutee 6-yard pass from Deshaun Watson (Kaʻimi Fairbairn kick), 11:03. Colts 21–7. Drive: 16 plays, 89 yards, 6:13.

Top passers

- IND – Andrew Luck – 19/32, 222 yards, 2 TD, INT
- HOU – Deshaun Watson – 29/49, 235 yards, TD, INT

Top rushers

- IND – Marlon Mack – 24 rushes, 148 yards, TD
- HOU – Deshaun Watson – 8 rushes, 76 yards

Top receivers

- IND – T. Y. Hilton – 5 receptions, 85 yards
- HOU – Keke Coutee – 11 receptions, 110 yards, TD

==== AFC Divisional Playoffs: at (1) Kansas City Chiefs ====
AFC Divisional Playoffs: (6) Indianapolis Colts at (1) Kansas City Chiefs – Game summary

Quarter	1	2	3	4	Total
Colts	0	7	0	6	13
Chiefs	14	10	0	7	31

at Arrowhead Stadium, Kansas City, Missouri

- Date: January 12, 2019
- Game time: 4:35 p.m. EST/3:35 p.m. CST
- Game weather: Snow, 32 °F (0 °C)
- Game attendance: 76,765
- Referee: John Hussey
- TV announcers (NBC): Al Michaels, Cris Collinsworth and Michele Tafoya
- Recap, Gamebook

Game information

First quarter

- KC – Damien Williams 10-yard run (Harrison Butker kick), 10:05. Chiefs 7–0. Drive: 5 plays, 90 yards, 3:00.
- KC – Tyreek Hill 36-yard run (Harrison Butker kick), 6:28. Chiefs 14–0. Drive: 8 plays, 70 yards, 3:04.

Second quarter

- KC – Harrison Butker 39-yard field goal, 12:13. Chiefs 17–0. Drive: 15 plays, 53 yards, 6:59.
- IND – Zach Pascal blocked punt recovery in the end zone (Adam Vinatieri kick), 5:56. Chiefs 17–7.
- KC – Patrick Mahomes 4-yard run (Harrison Butker kick), 1:40. Chiefs 24–7. Drive: 10 plays, 75 yards, 4:16.

Third quarter

- No scoring plays.

Fourth quarter

- IND – T. Y. Hilton 29-yard pass from Andrew Luck (kick failed, wide right), 5:31. Chiefs 24–13. Drive: 10 plays, 87 yards, 3:04.
- KC – Darrel Williams 6-yard run (Harrison Butker kick), 2:23. Chiefs 31–13. Drive: 9 plays, 61 yards, 3:08.

Top passers

- IND – Andrew Luck – 18/35, 196 yards, TD
- KC – Patrick Mahomes – 27/41, 278 yards

Top rushers

- IND – Marlon Mack – 9 rushes, 46 yards
- KC – Damien Williams – 25 rushes, 129 yards, TD

Top receivers

- IND – T. Y. Hilton – 4 receptions, 60 yards, TD
- KC – Travis Kelce – 7 receptions, 108 yards

This would be Andrew Luck's last game in the NFL, as he retired before the commencement of the 2019 NFL season.
