= 2023 Indianapolis Colts season =

71st season in franchise history

- Owner: Jim Irsay
- General manager: Chris Ballard
- Head coach: Shane Steichen
- Home stadium: Lucas Oil Stadium

Results
- Record: 9–8
- Division place: 3rd AFC South
- Playoffs: Did not qualify
- Pro Bowlers: G Quenton Nelson; C Ryan Kelly; DT DeForest Buckner; QB Gardner Minshew

Uniform
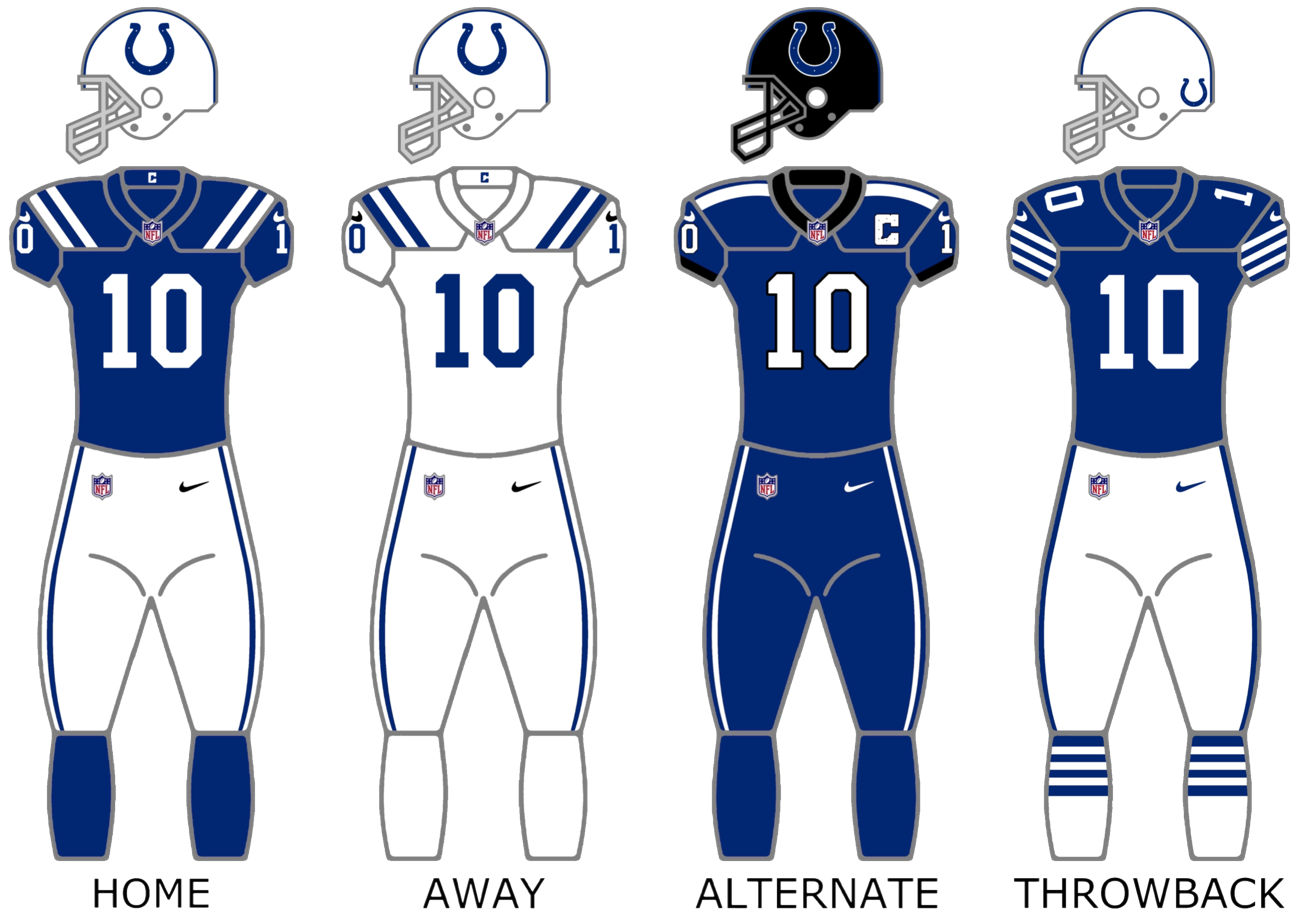

The 2023 season was the Indianapolis Colts' 71st season in the National Football League (NFL), their 40th in Indianapolis, and their 16th playing their home games at Lucas Oil Stadium. It was also their seventh under the leadership of general manager Chris Ballard and the first under new head coach Shane Steichen. Despite low expectations, the Colts improved on their 4–12–1 record from the previous season after a Week 10 victory over the New England Patriots in Frankfurt, and more than doubled their wins from the previous year, finishing with a 9–8 record. They were eliminated from playoff contention in the final week of the season for the second time in three seasons after a loss to the Houston Texans, extending their AFC South title drought to nine years.

== Draft ==
2023 Indianapolis Colts draft selections
Round	Selection	Player	Position	College	Notes
1	4	Anthony Richardson	QB	Florida	
2	35	Traded to the Las Vegas Raiders (Note: The Colts traded a second-round selection (35th overall) to the Las Vegas Raiders in exchange for second- and fifth-round selections (38th and 141st overall).)			
2	38	Traded to the Atlanta Falcons (Note: The Colts traded a second-round selection (38th overall) to the Atlanta Falcons in exchange for second- and fourth-round selections (44th and 110th overall).)			From Raiders
2	44	JuJu Brents	CB	Kansas State	From Falcons
3	67	Traded to the Denver Broncos (Note: The Colts traded a third-round selection (67th overall) and a 2022 fifth-round selection to the Denver Broncos in exchange for a 2022 third-round selection.)			
3	79	Josh Downs	WR	North Carolina	From Commanders (Note: The Colts traded 2022 second- and seventh-round selections, and QB Carson Wentz to the Washington Commanders in exchange for a conditional third-round selection (that would have become a second if Wentz played on 70% of the Commanders' 2022 offensive snaps), and 2022 second- and third-round selections.)
4	106	Blake Freeland	OT	BYU	
4	110	Adetomiwa Adebawore	DT	Northwestern	From Titans via Falcons
5	138	Darius Rush	CB	South Carolina	
5	141	Traded to the Minnesota Vikings (Note: The Colts traded a fifth-round selection (141st overall) to the Minnesota Vikings in exchange for fifth- and sixth-round selections (158th and 211th overall).)			From Raiders
5	158	Daniel Scott	S	California	From Vikings
5	162	Will Mallory	TE	Miami	From Bills (Note: The Colts traded RB Nyheim Hines to the Buffalo Bills in exchange for a fifth-round selection (162nd overall) and RB Zack Moss.)
5	176	Evan Hull	RB	Northwestern	Compensatory pick; From Cowboys (Note: The Colts traded CB Stephon Gilmore to the Dallas Cowboys in exchange for a fifth-round selection (176th overall).)
5	181	Traded to the Tampa Bay Buccaneers (Note: The Colts traded a sixth-round selection (181st overall) to the Tampa Bay Buccaneers in exchange for a seventh-round selection (236th overall) and LB Grant Stuard.)			
6	211	Titus Leo	OLB	Wagner	From Vikings
7	221	Jaylon Jones	CB	Texas A&M	
7	236	Jake Witt	OT	Northern Michigan	From Buccaneers

2023 Indianapolis Colts undrafted free agents
Position	Player	College
LB	Liam Anderson	Holy Cross
WR	Kody Case	Illinois
WR	Cody Chrest	Sam Houston
CB	Cole Coleman	Elon
G	Emil Ekiyor Jr.	Alabama
RB	Zavier Scott	Maine
S	Michael Tutsie	North Dakota State
QB	Kyle Vantrease	Georgia Southern
DT	Jamal Woods	Illinois

Draft trades

== Staff ==
2023 Indianapolis Colts staff
Front office: Owner/CEO – Jim Irsay; Vice chairman/co-owner – Carlie Irsay-Gordon; Vice chairman/co-owner – Casey Foyt; Vice chairman/co-owner – Kalen Jackson; General manager – Chris Ballard; Assistant general manager – Ed Dodds; Director of player personnel – Kevin Rogers Jr.; Director of football administration – Mike Bluem; Chief personnel executive – Morocco Brown; Director of pro scouting – Jon Shaw; Director of college scouting – Matt Terpening; Assistant director of college scouting – Jamie Moore; Senior player personnel scout – Todd Vasvari; Head coaches: Head coach – Shane Steichen; Offensive coaches: Offensive coordinator – Jim Bob Cooter; Quarterbacks – Cam Turner; Running backs – DeAndre Smith; Wide receivers – Reggie Wayne; Tight ends – Tom Manning; Offensive line – Tony Sparano Jr.; Assistant offensive line – Chris Watt; Offensive quality control/wide receivers – Brian Bratton	Defensive coaches: Defensive coordinator – Gus Bradley; Defensive line – Nate Ollie; Assistant defensive line – Matt Raich; Linebackers/run game coordinator – Richard Smith; Assistant linebackers – Cato June; Defensive backs – Ron Milus; Assistant defensive backs – Mike Mitchell; Defensive assistant – Payton McCollum; Defensive quality control – Brent Jackson; Special teams coaches: Special teams coordinator – Brian Mason; Assistant special teams – Joe Hastings; Strength and conditioning: Director of sports performance – Rusty Jones; Head strength and conditioning – Richard Howell; Assistant strength and conditioning – Zane Fakes; Applied sports science/conditioning – Doug McKenney; Functional movement therapist/conditioning – Sam Khym

== Final roster ==
2023 Indianapolis Colts roster
Quarterbacks (QB): 4 Sam Ehlinger; 10 Gardner Minshew; Running backs (RB): 31 Tyler Goodson; 21 Zack Moss; 27 Trey Sermon; 28 Jonathan Taylor; Wide receivers (WR): 1 Josh Downs; 2 D. J. Montgomery; 14 Alec Pierce; 11 Michael Pittman Jr.; 9 Juwann Winfree; Tight ends (TE): 81 Mo Alie-Cox; 83 Kylen Granson; 86 Will Mallory; 85 Drew Ogletree (Exempt)	Offensive linemen (OL): 67 Jack Anderson C/G; 73 Blake Freeland T; 62 Wesley French C; 75 Will Fries G; 78 Ryan Kelly C; 56 Quenton Nelson G; 79 Bernhard Raimann T; 65 Josh Sills G; 72 Braden Smith T; Defensive linemen (DL): 95 Adetomiwa Adebawore DT; 96 Taven Bryan DT; 99 DeForest Buckner DT; 52 Samson Ebukam DE; 93 Eric Johnson DT; 55 Isaiah Land DE; 94 Tyquan Lewis DE; 92 Jacob Martin DE; 54 Dayo Odeyingbo DE; 51 Kwity Paye DE; 90 Grover Stewart DT	Linebackers (LB): 44 Zaire Franklin MLB; 48 Ronnie Harrison OLB; 59 Cameron McGrone OLB; 50 Segun Olubi MLB; 45 E. J. Speed OLB; 41 Grant Stuard OLB; Defensive backs (DB): 39 Darrell Baker Jr. CB; 36 Henry Black FS; 29 JuJu Brents CB; 20 Nick Cross FS; 43 Trevor Denbow SS; 40 Jaylon Jones CB; 35 Chris Lammons CB; 23 Kenny Moore CB; 37 Ameer Speed CB; 25 Rodney Thomas II FS; Special teams (ST): 7 Matt Gay K; 46 Luke Rhodes LS; 8 Rigoberto Sanchez P	Practice squad: 98 McTelvin Agim DT; 49 Austin Ajiake MLB; 47 Liam Anderson MLB; 68 Ike Boettger G; 15 Tyrie Cleveland WR; 42 Marcel Dabo SS (IPP); 3 Ethan Fernea WR; 30 Darren Hall CB; 64 Arlington Hambright G; 13 K. J. Hamler WR (PS/I); 36 Tyreque Jones FS; 57 Zach McCloud OLB; 17 Jaydon Mickens WR; 12 Kellen Mond QB; 97 Al-Quadin Muhammad DE (Susp.); 84 Jordan Murray TE; 58 Derek Rivers DE (PS/I); 34 Zavier Scott RB; 37 Isaac Taylor-Stuart CB (PS/I); 49 Eric Tomlinson TE; 69 Jared Veldheer T; Reserve: 92 Genard Avery DE (IR); 32 Julian Blackmon SS (IR); 38 Tony Brown CB (Susp.); 16 Ashton Dulin WR (IR); 33 Dallis Flowers CB (IR); 26 Evan Hull RB (IR); 91 Titus Leo DE (IR); 6 Isaiah McKenzie WR (Susp.); 63 Danny Pinter G/C (IR); 5 Anthony Richardson QB (IR); 31 Daniel Scott SS (IR); 76 Jake Witt T (IR); 80 Jelani Woods TE (IR); Rookies in italics 53 active (1 exempt), 13 reserve, 16 practice squad (5 exempt)

== Preseason ==
The Colts opened their 2023 preseason with a 23–19 loss to the Buffalo Bills on August 12, 2023. Anthony Richardson, the fourth overall selection in the 2023 NFL draft, started the game, completing seven of his 12 passes for 67 yards while being intercepted once. He was also credited with two carries for seven yards. Three days later, Richardson was named the team's starter for the regular season by first-year head coach Shane Steichen.

Week	Date	Opponent	Result	Record	Venue	Recap
1	August 12	at Buffalo Bills	L 19–23	0–1	Highmark Stadium	Recap
2	August 19	Chicago Bears	W 24–17	1–1	Lucas Oil Stadium	Recap
3	August 24	at Philadelphia Eagles	W 27–13	2–1	Lincoln Financial Field	Recap

== Regular season ==
=== Schedule ===
Week	Date	Opponent	Result	Record	Venue	Recap
1	September 10	**Jacksonville Jaguars**	**L** 21–31	0–1	Lucas Oil Stadium	Recap
2	September 17	at **Houston Texans**	**W** 31–20	1–1	NRG Stadium	Recap
3	September 24	at Baltimore Ravens	**W** 22–19 (OT)	2–1	M&T Bank Stadium	Recap
4	October 1	Los Angeles Rams	**L** 23–29 (OT)	2–2	Lucas Oil Stadium	Recap
5	October 8	**Tennessee Titans**	**W** 23–16	3–2	Lucas Oil Stadium	Recap
6	October 15	at **Jacksonville Jaguars**	**L** 20–37	3–3	EverBank Stadium	Recap
7	October 22	Cleveland Browns	**L** 38–39	3–4	Lucas Oil Stadium	Recap
8	October 29	New Orleans Saints	**L** 27–38	3–5	Lucas Oil Stadium	Recap
9	November 5	at Carolina Panthers	**W** 27–13	4–5	Bank of America Stadium	Recap
10	November 12	at New England Patriots	**W** 10–6	5–5	(Germany) Deutsche Bank Park (Frankfurt)	Recap
11	Bye					
12	November 26	Tampa Bay Buccaneers	**W** 27–20	6–5	Lucas Oil Stadium	Recap
13	December 3	at **Tennessee Titans**	**W** 31–28 (OT)	7–5	Nissan Stadium	Recap
14	December 10	at Cincinnati Bengals	**L** 14–34	7–6	Paycor Stadium	Recap
15	December 16	Pittsburgh Steelers	**W** 30–13	8–6	Lucas Oil Stadium	Recap
16	December 24	at Atlanta Falcons	**L** 10–29	8–7	Mercedes-Benz Stadium	Recap
17	December 31	Las Vegas Raiders	**W** 23–20	9–7	Lucas Oil Stadium	Recap
18	January 6	**Houston Texans**	**L** 19–23	9–8	Lucas Oil Stadium	Recap

Note: Intra-division opponents are in bold text.

=== Game summaries ===
==== Week 1: vs. Jacksonville Jaguars ====
Week 1: Jacksonville Jaguars at Indianapolis Colts – Game summary

Quarter	1	2	3	4	Total
**Jaguars**	7	7	3	14	**31**
Colts	0	7	14	0	**21**

at Lucas Oil Stadium, Indianapolis, Indiana

- Date: September 10
- Game time: 1:00 p.m. EDT
- Game weather: None (retractable roof closed)
- Game attendance: 65,749
- Referee: Clay Martin
- TV announcers (Fox): Kenny Albert, Jonathan Vilma and Shannon Spake
- Recap, Game Book

Game information

**First quarter**

- JAX – Calvin Ridley 9-yard pass from Trevor Lawrence (Brandon McManus kick), 5:18. Jaguars 7–0. **Drive: 9 plays, 61 yards, 5:07.**

**Second quarter**

- IND – Anthony Richardson 2-yard run (Matt Gay kick), 14:57. Tied 7–7. **Drive: 11 plays, 75 yards, 5:21.**
- JAX – Zay Jones 18-yard pass from Trevor Lawrence (Brandon McManus kick), 4:56. Jaguars 14–7. **Drive: 7 plays, 57 yards, 3:55.**

**Third quarter**

- IND – Michael Pittman Jr. 39-yard pass from Anthony Richardson (Matt Gay kick), 11:25. Tied 14–14. **Drive: 6 plays, 63 yards, 2:35.**
- JAX – Brandon McManus 45-yard field goal, 8:31. Jaguars 17–14. **Drive: 8 plays, 48 yards, 2:54.**
- IND – DeForest Buckner 26-yard fumble return (Matt Gay kick), 2:27. Colts 21–17.

**Fourth quarter**

- JAX – Tank Bigsby 1-yard run (Brandon McManus kick), 5:14. Jaguars 24–21. **Drive: 10 plays, 46 yards, 5:32.**
- JAX – Travis Etienne 26-yard run (Brandon McManus kick), 4:08. Jaguars 31–21. **Drive: 3 plays, 44 yards, 0:52.**

**Top passers**

- JAX – Trevor Lawrence – 24/32, 241 yards, 2 TD, INT
- IND – Anthony Richardson – 24/37, 223 yards, TD, INT

**Top rushers**

- JAX – Travis Etienne – 18 rushes, 77 yards, TD
- IND – Anthony Richardson – 10 rushes, 40 yards, TD

**Top receivers**

- JAX – Calvin Ridley – 8 receptions, 101 yards, TD
- IND – Michael Pittman Jr. – 8 receptions, 97 yards, TD

With the loss, the Colts started their season at 0–1. The Colts failed to win in Week 1 for the 10th straight season.

==== Week 2: at Houston Texans ====
Week 2: Indianapolis Colts at Houston Texans – Game summary

Quarter	1	2	3	4	Total
**Colts**	14	14	3	0	**31**
Texans	7	3	0	10	**20**

at NRG Stadium, Houston, Texas

- Date: September 17
- Game time: 1:00 p.m. EDT/12:00 p.m. CDT
- Game weather: None (retractable roof closed)
- Game attendance: 71,159
- Referee: Carl Cheffers
- TV announcers (Fox): Chris Myers, Robert Smith and Jen Hale
- Recap, Game Book

Game information

**First quarter**

- IND – Anthony Richardson 18-yard run (Matt Gay kick), 10:44. Colts 7–0. **Drive: 10 plays, 75 yards, 4:16.**
- IND – Anthony Richardson 15-yard run (Matt Gay kick), 9:13. Colts 14–0. **Drive: 1 play, 15 yards, 0:05.**
- HOU – Nico Collins 8-yard pass from C. J. Stroud (Kaʻimi Fairbairn kick), 3:14. Colts 14–7. **Drive: 13 plays, 68 yards, 5:59.**

**Second quarter**

- IND – Zack Moss 11-yard run (Matt Gay kick), 9:43. Colts 21–7. **Drive: 6 plays, 76 yards, 3:02.**
- HOU – Kaʻimi Fairbairn 29-yard field goal, 4:25. Colts 21–10. **Drive: 9 plays, 64 yards, 5:18.**
- IND – Kylen Granson 4-yard pass from Gardner Minshew (Matt Gay kick), 0:10. Colts 28–10. **Drive: 14 plays, 75 yards, 4:15.**

**Third quarter**

- IND – Matt Gay 42-yard field goal, 5:50. Colts 31–10. **Drive: 9 plays, 56 yards, 3:18.**

**Fourth quarter**

- HOU – Kaʻimi Fairbairn 36-yard field goal, 13:24. Colts 31–13. **Drive: 13 plays, 57 yards, 7:26.**
- HOU – Tank Dell 23-yard pass from C. J. Stroud (Kaʻimi Fairbairn kick), 9:48. Colts 31–20. **Drive: 5 plays, 67 yards, 1:41.**

**Top passers**

- IND – Gardner Minshew – 19/23, 171 yards, TD
- HOU – C. J. Stroud – 30/47, 384 yards, 2 TD

**Top rushers**

- IND – Zack Moss – 18 rushes, 88 yards, TD
- HOU – Dameon Pierce – 15 rushes, 31 yards

**Top receivers**

- IND – Michael Pittman Jr. – 8 receptions, 56 yards
- HOU – Nico Collins – 7 receptions, 146 yards, TD

==== Week 3: at Baltimore Ravens ====
Week 3: Indianapolis Colts at Baltimore Ravens – Game summary

Quarter	1	2	3	4	OT	Total
**Colts**	0	10	3	6	3	**22**
Ravens	7	0	7	5	0	**19**

at M&T Bank Stadium, Baltimore, Maryland

- Date: September 24
- Game time: 1:00 p.m. EDT
- Game weather: Steady rain, 68 °F (20 °C)
- Game attendance: 70,038
- Referee: Clete Blakeman
- TV announcers (CBS): Beth Mowins, James Lofton, Jay Feely and Amanda Renner
- Recap, Game Book

Game information

**First quarter**

- BAL – Lamar Jackson 8-yard run (Justin Tucker kick), 6:35. Ravens 7–0. **Drive: 12 plays, 80 yards, 6:31.**

**Second quarter**

- IND – Zack Moss 17-yard pass from Gardner Minshew (Matt Gay kick), 6:07. Tied 7–7. **Drive: 9 plays, 73 yards, 4:29.**
- IND – Matt Gay 31-yard field goal, 3:26. Colts 10–7. **Drive: 7 plays, 7 yards, 2:32.**

**Third quarter**

- IND – Matt Gay 54-yard field goal, 8:33. Colts 13–7. **Drive: 6 plays, 19 yards, 2:21.**
- BAL – Lamar Jackson 10-yard run (Justin Tucker kick), 0:13. Ravens 14–13. **Drive: 10 plays, 81 yards, 5:16.**

**Fourth quarter**

- IND – Matt Gay 53-yard field goal, 11:22. Colts 16–14. **Drive: 8 plays, 40 yards, 3:51.**
- BAL – Justin Tucker 50-yard field goal, 7:33. Ravens 17–16. **Drive: 8 plays, 43 yards, 3:49.**
- BAL – Gardner Minshew sacked out of bounds in end zone for a safety, 2:03. Ravens 19–16.
- IND – Matt Gay 53-yard field goal, 0:57. Tied 19–19. **Drive: 6 plays, 28 yards, 0:44.**

**Overtime**

- IND – Matt Gay 53-yard field goal, 1:09. Colts 22–19. **Drive: 5 plays, 18 yards, 2:12.**

**Top passers**

- IND – Gardner Minshew – 27/44, 227 yards, TD
- BAL – Lamar Jackson – 22/31, 202 yards

**Top rushers**

- IND – Zack Moss – 30 rushes, 122 yards
- BAL – Lamar Jackson – 14 rushes, 101 yards, 2 TD

**Top receivers**

- IND – Michael Pittman Jr. – 9 receptions, 77 yards
- BAL – Zay Flowers – 8 receptions, 48 yards

With the upset victory over the Ravens, the Colts picked up their second win of the season, improving to 2–1. By successfully kicking four field goals of a distance of 50 yards or greater (54, 53, 53, 53) in a single game, Matt Gay became the first kicker in NFL history to accomplish the feat.

==== Week 4: vs. Los Angeles Rams ====
Week 4: Los Angeles Rams at Indianapolis Colts – Game summary

Quarter	1	2	3	4	OT	Total
**Rams**	14	6	3	0	6	**29**
Colts	0	0	8	15	0	**23**

at Lucas Oil Stadium, Indianapolis, Indiana

- Date: October 1
- Game time: 1:00 p.m. EDT
- Game weather: None (retractable roof closed)
- Game attendance: 65,337
- Referee: Land Clark
- TV announcers (Fox): Kenny Albert, Jonathan Vilma and Shannon Spake
- Recap, Game Book

Game information

**First quarter**

- LAR – Kyren Williams 3-yard run (Brett Maher kick), 11:35. Rams 7–0. **Drive: 8 plays, 75 yards, 3:25.**
- LAR – Kyren Williams 3-yard run (Brett Maher kick), 1:45. Rams 14–0. **Drive: 10 plays, 94 yards, 4:38.**

**Second quarter**

- LAR – Brett Maher 40-yard field goal, 12:52. Rams 17–0. **Drive: 7 plays, 38 yards, 4:40.**
- LAR – Brett Maher 54-yard field goal, 5:48. Rams 20–0. **Drive: 10 plays, 50 yards, 5:29.**

**Third quarter**

- LAR – Brett Maher 51-yard field goal, 7:17. Rams 23–0. **Drive: 9 plays, 38 yards, 5:25.**
- IND – Mo Alie-Cox 35-yard pass from Anthony Richardson (Anthony Richardson–Zack Moss pass), 5:26. Rams 23–8. **Drive: 4 plays, 75 yards, 1:51.**

**Fourth quarter**

- IND – Anthony Richardson 1 yard run (Matt Gay kick), 11:45. Rams 23–15. **Drive: 6 plays, 62 yards, 2:31.**
- IND – Drew Ogletree 5-yard pass from Anthony Richardson (Anthony Richardson–Michael Pittman pass), 1:56. Tied 23–23. 'Drive: 13 plays, 83 yards, 5:33.

**Overtime**

- LAR – Puka Nacua 22-yard pass from Matthew Stafford, 5:49. Rams 29–23. **Drive: 8 plays, 75 yards, 4:11.**

**Top passers**

- LAR – Matthew Stafford – 27/40, 319 yards, TD, INT
- IND – Anthony Richardson – 11/25, 200 yards, TD

**Top rushers**

- LAR – Kyren Williams – 25 rushes, 103 yards, 2 TDs
- IND – Zack Moss – 18 rushes, 70 yards

**Top receivers**

- LAR – Puka Nacua – 9 receptions, 163 yards, TD
- IND – Drew Ogletree – 3 receptions, 48 yards, TD

Despite the Colts' comeback from 23 points down to force overtime, it was not enough, as they lost to the Rams 29–23. With the loss, the Colts evened their record at 2–2.

==== Week 5: vs. Tennessee Titans ====
Week 5: Tennessee Titans at Indianapolis Colts – Game summary

Quarter	1	2	3	4	Total
Titans	3	3	10	0	**16**
**Colts**	7	3	7	6	**23**

at Lucas Oil Stadium, Indianapolis, Indiana

- Date: October 8
- Game time: 1:00 p.m. EDT
- Game weather: Cloudy, 53 °F (12 °C) (retractable roof open)
- Game attendance: 65,287
- Referee: Brad Rogers
- TV announcers (CBS): Spero Dedes, Adam Archuleta and Amanda Renner
- Recap, Game Book

Game information

**First quarter**

- TEN – Nick Folk 27-yard field goal, 3:13. Titans 3–0. **Drive: 16 plays, 75 yards, 8:31.**
- IND – Zack Moss 56-yard run (Matt Gay kick), 0:41. Colts 7–3. **Drive: 5 plays, 75 yards, 2:32.**

**Second quarter**

- IND – Matt Gay 43-yard field goal, 9:32. Colts 10–3. **Drive: 10 plays, 40 yards, 5:06.**
- TEN – Nick Folk 53-yard field goal, 4:39. Colts 10–6. **Drive: 10 plays, 48 yards, 4:53.**

**Third quarter**

- TEN – Tyjae Spears 19-yard run (Nick Folk kick), 12:48. Titans 13–10. **Drive: 4 plays, 75 yards, 2:12.**
- IND – Zack Moss 3-yard run (Matt Gay kick), 8:00. Colts 17–13. **Drive: 9 plays, 75 yards, 4:48.**
- TEN – Nick Folk 34-yard field goal, 2:02. Colts 17–16. **Drive: 11 plays, 59 yards, 5:58.**

**Fourth quarter**

- IND – Matt Gay 35-yard field goal, 13:22. Colts 20–16. **Drive: 7 plays, 58 yards, 3:40.**
- IND – Matt Gay 28-yard field goal, 1:00. Colts 23–16. **Drive: 14 plays, 84 yards, 7:03.**

**Top passers**

- TEN – Ryan Tannehill – 23/34, 264 yards, INT
- IND – Gardner Minshew – 11/14, 155 yards

**Top rushers**

- TEN – Derrick Henry – 13 rushes, 43 yards
- IND – Zack Moss – 23 rushes, 165 yards, 2 TD

**Top receivers**

- TEN – Dustin Hopkins – 8 receptions, 140 yards
- IND – Josh Downs – 6 receptions, 97 yards

Quarterback Anthony Richardson suffered a season-ending AC joint injury in this game. However, the Colts were still able to pull out a victory.

==== Week 6: at Jacksonville Jaguars ====
Week 6: Indianapolis Colts at Jacksonville Jaguars – Game summary

Quarter	1	2	3	4	Total
Colts	3	3	0	14	**20**
**Jaguars**	0	21	10	6	**37**

at EverBank Stadium, Jacksonville, Florida

- Date: October 15
- Game time: 1:00 p.m. EDT
- Game weather: 68 °F (20 °C)
- Game attendance: 64,851
- Referee: Alex Kemp
- TV announcers (CBS): Spero Dedes, Adam Archuleta and Amanda Renner
- Recap, Game Book

Game information

**First quarter**

- IND – Matt Gay 28-yard field goal, 6:27. Colts 3–0. **Drive: 16 plays, 65 yards, 8:33.**

**Second quarter**

- JAX – Travis Etienne 2-yard run (Brandon McManus kick), 14:17. Jaguars 7–3. **Drive: 13 plays, 75 yards, 7:10.**
- JAX – Travis Etienne 22-yard run (Brandon McManus kick), 14:01. Jaguars 14–3. **Drive: 1 play, 22 yards, 0:09.**
- JAX – Christian Kirk 29-yard pass from Trevor Lawrence (Brandon McManus kick), 1:40. Jaguars 21–3. **Drive: 9 plays, 65 yards, 2:59.**
- IND – Matt Gay 56-yard field goal, 0:06. Jaguars 21–6. **Drive: 9 plays, 37 yards, 1:34.**

**Third quarter**

- JAX – Brandon McManus 48-yard field goal, 10:44. Jaguars 24–6. **Drive: 4 plays, 9 yards, 1:47.**
- JAX – Brenton Strange 10-yard pass from Trevor Lawrence (Brandon McManus kick), 3:51. Jaguars 31–6. **Drive: 9 plays, 69 yards, 4:42.**

**Fourth quarter**

- IND – Josh Downs 2-yard pass from Gardner Minshew (Matt Gay kick), 14:14. Jaguars 31–13. **Drive: 12 plays, 75 yards, 4:37.**
- IND – Zack Moss 3-yard run (Matt Gay kick), 7:14. Jaguars 31–20. **Drive: 4 plays, 72 yards, 1:28.**
- JAX – Brandon McManus 49-yard field goal, 4:50. Jaguars 34–20. **Drive: 4 plays, 6 yards, 2:24.**
- JAX – Brandon McManus 51-yard field goal, 3:00. Jaguars 37–20. **Drive: 4 plays, −14 yards, 0:19.**

**Top passers**

- IND – Gardner Minshew – 33/55, 329 yards, TD, 3 INT
- JAX – Trevor Lawrence – 20/30, 181 yards, 2 TD, INT

**Top rushers**

- IND – Zack Moss – 7 rushes, 21 yards, TD
- JAX – Travis Etienne – 18 rushes, 55 yards, 2 TD

**Top receivers**

- IND – Michael Pittman Jr. – 9 receptions, 109 yards
- JAX – Christian Kirk – 3 receptions, 49 yards, TD

The Colts had their ninth consecutive loss in Jacksonville.

==== Week 7: vs. Cleveland Browns ====
Week 7: Cleveland Browns at Indianapolis Colts – Game summary

Quarter	1	2	3	4	Total
**Browns**	7	20	3	9	**39**
Colts	14	7	7	10	**38**

at Lucas Oil Stadium, Indianapolis, Indiana

- Date: October 22
- Game time: 1:00 p.m. EDT
- Game weather: Sunny, 53 °F (12 °C) (retractable roof open)
- Game attendance: 65,552
- Referee: Shawn Smith
- TV announcers (CBS): Spero Dedes, Adam Archuleta and Aditi Kinkhabwala
- Recap, Game Book

Game information

**First quarter**

- CLE – Jerome Ford 69-yard run (Dustin Hopkins kick), 14:03. Browns 7–0. **Drive: 3 plays, 77 yards, 0:57.**
- IND – Josh Downs 59-yard pass from Gardner Minshew (Matt Gay kick), 11:38. Tied 7–7. **Drive: 6 plays, 75 yards, 2:25.**
- IND – Gardner Minshew 1-yard run (Matt Gay kick), 4:28. Colts 14–7. **Drive: 6 plays, 57 yards, 2:25.**

**Second quarter**

- CLE – Kareem Hunt 2-yard run (Dustin Hopkins kick), 14:22. Tied 14–14. **Drive: 5 plays, 36 yards, 2:01.**
- CLE – Dustin Hopkins 44-yard field goal, 8:38. Browns 17–14. **Drive: 4 plays, 0 yards, 1:31.**
- IND – Gardner Minshew 4-yard run (Matt Gay kick), 3:51. Colts 21–17. **Drive: 8 plays, 75 yards, 4:47.**
- CLE – Tony Fields II fumble recovery in end zone (Dustin Hopkins kick), 1:42. Browns 24–21.
- CLE – Dustin Hopkins 54-yard field goal, 0:00. Browns 27–21. **Drive: 7 play, 34 yards, 1:17.**

**Third quarter**

- CLE – Dustin Hopkins 54-yard field goal, 9:23. Browns 30–21. **Drive: 4 play, 6 yards, 0:53.**
- IND – Jonathan Taylor 5-yard run (Matt Gay kick), 5:11. Browns 30–28. **Drive: 8 plays, 75 yards, 4:12.**

**Fourth quarter**

- IND – Matt Gay 27-yard field goal, 14:09. Colts 31–30. **Drive: 7 plays, 41 yards, 3:09.**
- CLE – Dustin Hopkins 58-yard field goal, 6:33. Browns 33–31. **Drive: 6 play, 17 yards, 2:29.**
- IND – Michael Pittman Jr. 75-yard pass from Gardner Minshew (Matt Gay kick), 5:38. Colts 38–33. **Drive: 2 plays, 75 yards, 0:55.**
- CLE – Kareem Hunt 1-yard run (run failed), 0:15. Browns 39–38. **Drive: 12 plays, 80 yards, 2:20.**

**Top passers**

- CLE – P. J. Walker – 15/32, 178 yards, INT
- IND – Gardner Minshew – 15/23, 305 yards, 2 TD, INT

**Top rushers**

- CLE – Jerome Ford – 11 rushes, 74 yards, TD
- IND – Jonathan Taylor – 18 rushes, 75 yards, TD

**Top receivers**

- CLE – David Njoku – 5 receptions, 54 yards
- IND – Josh Downs – 5 receptions, 125 yards, TD

==== Week 8: vs. New Orleans Saints ====
Week 8: New Orleans Saints at Indianapolis Colts – Game summary

Quarter	1	2	3	4	Total
**Saints**	7	14	7	10	**38**
Colts	7	13	0	7	**27**

at Lucas Oil Stadium, Indianapolis, Indiana

- Date: October 29
- Game time: 1:00 p.m. EDT
- Game weather: None (retractable roof closed)
- Game attendance: 65,427
- Referee: Craig Wrolstad
- TV announcers (Fox): Kevin Kugler, Mark Sanchez and Laura Okmin
- Recap, Game Book

Game information

**First quarter**

- IND – Michael Pittman Jr. 10-yard pass from Gardner Minshew (Matt Gay kick), 6:56. Colts 7–0. **Drive: 7 plays, 81 yards, 4:19.**
- NO – Alvin Kamara 18-yard pass from Derek Carr (Blake Grupe kick), 3:44. Tied 7–7. **Drive: 7 plays, 75 yards, 3:12.**

**Second quarter**

- IND – Matt Gay 20-yard field goal, 14:49. Colts 10–7. **Drive: 9 plays, 73 yards, 3:55.**
- IND – Zack Moss 1-yard run (Matt Gay kick), 11:39. Colts 17–7. **Drive: 6 plays, 30 yards, 2:36.**
- NO – Taysom Hill 20-yard run (Blake Grupe kick), 7:28. Colts 17–14. **Drive: 8 plays, 75 yards, 4:11.**
- NO – Rashid Shaheed 58-yard pass from Derek Carr (Blake Grupe kick), 5:42. Saints 21–17. **Drive: 2 plays, 63 yards, 0:42.**
- IND – Matt Gay 42-yard field goal, 0:21. Saints 21–20. **Drive: 13 plays, 51 yards, 5:21.**

**Third quarter**

- NO – Alvin Kamara 15-yard run (Blake Grupe kick), 0:07. Saints 28–20. **Drive: 7 plays, 71 yards, 3:37.**

**Fourth quarter**

- NO – Taysom Hill 1-yard run (Blake Grupe kick), 10:49. Saints 35–20. **Drive: 8 plays, 76 yards, 3:53.**
- IND – Drew Ogletree 33-yard pass from Gardner Minshew (Matt Gay kick), 8:19. Saints 35–27. **Drive: 6 play, 75 yards, 2:30.**
- NO – Blake Grupe 27-yard field goal, 0:24. Saints 38–27. **Drive: 9 plays, 58 yards, 3:24.**

**Top passers**

- NO – Derek Carr – 19/27, 310 yards, 2 TD
- IND – Gardner Minshew – 23/41, 213 yards, 2 TD, INT

**Top rushers**

- NO – Taysom Hill – 9 rushes, 63 yards, 2 TD
- IND – Jonathan Taylor – 12 rushes, 95 yards

**Top receivers**

- NO – Chris Olave – 5 receptions, 46 yards
- IND – Michael Pittman Jr. – 8 receptions, 40 yards, TD

==== Week 9: at Carolina Panthers ====
Week 9: Indianapolis Colts at Carolina Panthers – Game summary

Quarter	1	2	3	4	Total
**Colts**	0	20	0	7	**27**
Panthers	0	3	7	3	**13**

at Bank of America Stadium, Charlotte, North Carolina

- Date: November 5
- Game time: 4:05 p.m. EST
- Game weather: Clear, 75 °F (24 °C)
- Game attendance: 72,301
- Referee: Bill Vinovich
- TV announcers (CBS): Kevin Harlan, Trent Green and Melanie Collins
- Recap, Game Book

Game information

**First quarter**

- No scoring plays.

**Second quarter**

- IND – Matt Gay 26-yard field goal, 13:52. Colts 3–0. **Drive: 15 plays, 75 yards, 7:19.**
- IND – Jonathan Taylor 10-yard pass from Gardner Minshew (Matt Gay kick), 7:43. Colts 10–0. **Drive: 9 plays, 64 yards, 4:29.**
- CAR – Eddy Pineiro 35-yard field goal, 3:34. Colts 10–3. **Drive: 9 plays, 39 yards, 4:09.**
- IND – Matt Gay 57-yard field goal, 0:53. Colts 13–3. **Drive: 11 plays, 36 yards, 2:41.**
- IND – Kenny Moore II 49-yard interception return (Matt Gay kick), 0:20. Colts 20–3.

**Third quarter**

- CAR – DJ Chark Jr. 5-yard pass from Bryce Young (Eddy Pineiro kick), 4:34. Colts 20–10. **Drive: 15 plays, 77 yards, 7:55.**

**Fourth quarter**

- IND – Kenny Moore II 66-yard interception return (Matt Gay kick), 13:40. Colts 27–10.
- CAR – Eddy Pineiro 49-yard field goal, 8:09. Colts 27–13. **Drive: 14 plays, 44 yards, 5:31.**

**Top passers**

- IND – Gardner Minshew – 17/26, 127 yards, TD
- CAR – Bryce Young – 24/39, 173 yards, TD, 3 INT

**Top rushers**

- IND – Jonathan Taylor – 18 rushes, 47 yards
- CAR – Chuba Hubbard – 16 rushes, 58 yards

**Top receivers**

- IND – Michael Pittman Jr. – 8 receptions, 64 yards
- CAR – Hayden Hurst – 2 receptions, 54 yards

==== Week 10: at New England Patriots ====
NFL Germany games

Week 10: Indianapolis Colts at New England Patriots – Game summary

Quarter	1	2	3	4	Total
**Colts**	7	0	0	3	**10**
Patriots	3	0	0	3	**6**

at Deutsche Bank Park, Frankfurt, Hesse, Germany

- Date: November 12
- Game time: 3:30 p.m. CET/9:30 a.m. EST
- Game weather: Cloudy, 47 °F (8 °C)
- Game attendance: 50,144
- Referee: Tra Blake
- TV announcers (WXIN/NFLN): Rich Eisen, Jason McCourty, Sara Walsh and Stacey Dales
- Recap, Game Book

Game information

**First quarter**

- NE – Chad Ryland 37-yard field goal, 8:11. Patriots 3–0. **Drive: 13 plays, 61 yards, 6:49.**
- IND – Jonathan Taylor 1-yard run (Matt Gay kick), 0:58. Colts 7–3. **Drive: 14 plays, 75 yards, 7:13.**

**Second quarter**

- No scoring plays.

**Third quarter**

- No scoring plays.

**Fourth quarter**

- NE – Chad Ryland 24-yard field goal, 12:44. Colts 7–6. **Drive: 15 plays, 89 yards, 8:04.**
- IND – Matt Gay 51-yard field goal, 8:54. Colts 10–6. **Drive: 7 plays, 20 yards, 3:50.**

**Top passers**

- IND – Gardner Minshew – 18/28, 194 yards, INT
- NE – Mac Jones – 15/20, 170 yards, INT

**Top rushers**

- IND – Jonathan Taylor – 23 rushes, 69 yards, TD
- NE – Rhamondre Stevenson – 20 rushes, 88 yards

**Top receivers**

- IND – Michael Pittman Jr. – 8 receptions, 84 yards
- NE – Demario Douglas – 6 receptions, 84 yards

The Colts beat the Patriots on the road for the first time since 2006.

==== Week 12: vs. Tampa Bay Buccaneers ====
Week 12: Tampa Bay Buccaneers at Indianapolis Colts – Game summary

Quarter	1	2	3	4	Total
Buccaneers	3	7	0	10	**20**
**Colts**	10	7	3	7	**27**

at Lucas Oil Stadium, Indianapolis, Indiana

- Date: November 26
- Game time: 1:00 p.m. EST
- Game weather: None (retractable roof closed)
- Game attendance: 64,407
- Referee: Clete Blakeman
- TV announcers (CBS): Spero Dedes, Adam Archuleta and Amanda Renner
- Recap, Game Book

Game information

**First quarter**

- TB – Chase McLaughlin 21-yard field goal, 7:28. Buccaners 3–0. **Drive: 15 plays, 72 yards, 7:32.**
- IND – Matt Gay 46-yard field goal, 3:01. Tied 3–3. **Drive: 10 plays, 46 yards, 4:27.**
- IND – Jonathan Taylor 1-yard run (Matt Gay kick), 0:11. Colts 10–3. **Drive: 4 plays, 41 yards, 1:38.**

**Second quarter**

- IND – Gardner Minshew 2-yard run (Matt Gay kick), 9:36. Colts 17–3. **Drive: 10 plays, 62 yards, 4:15.**
- TB – Mike Evans 1-yard pass from Baker Mayfield (Chase McLaughlin kick), 5:08. Colts 17–10. **Drive: 3 plays, 16 yards, 1:25.**

**Third quarter**

- IND – Matt Gay 36-yard field goal, 10:01. Colts 20–10. **Drive: 11 plays, 57 yards, 4:59.**

**Fourth quarter**

- TB – Mike Evans 23-yard pass from Baker Mayfield (Chase McLaughlin kick), 12:50. Colts 20–17. **Drive: 9 plays, 60 yards, 3:56.**
- IND – Jonathan Taylor 1-yard run (Matt Gay kick), 7:30. Colts 27–17. **Drive: 9 plays, 75 yards, 5:20.**
- TB – Chase McLaughlin 24-yard field goal, 4:10. Colts 27–20. **Drive: 9 plays, 69 yards, 3:20.**

**Top passers**

- TB – Baker Mayfield – 20/30, 199 yards, 2 TD, INT
- IND – Gardner Minshew – 24/41, 251 yards, INT

**Top rushers**

- TB – Rachaad White – 15 rushes, 100 yards
- IND – Jonathan Taylor – 15 rushes, 91 yards, 2 TD

**Top receivers**

- TB – Mike Evans – 6 receptions, 70 yards, 2 TD
- IND – Michael Pittman Jr. – 10 receptions, 107 yards

==== Week 13: at Tennessee Titans ====
Week 13: Indianapolis Colts at Tennessee Titans – Game summary

Quarter	1	2	3	4	OT	Total
**Colts**	7	6	9	3	6	**31**
Titans	10	7	2	6	3	**28**

at Nissan Stadium, Nashville, Tennessee

- Date: December 3
- Game time: 1:00 p.m. EST/12:00 p.m. CST
- Game weather: Partly sunny, 53 °F (12 °C)
- Game attendance: 62,641
- Referee: Craig Wrolstad
- TV announcers (CBS): Andrew Catalon, Tiki Barber, Matt Ryan and AJ Ross
- Recap, Game Book

Game information

**First quarter**

- TEN – Derrick Henry 22-yard run (Nick Folk kick), 13:20. Titans 7–0. **Drive: 5 plays, 75 yards, 1:48.**
- IND – Alec Pierce 36-yard pass from Gardner Minshew (Matt Gay kick), 12:05. Tied 7–7. **Drive: 3 plays, 56 yards, 1:15.**
- TEN – Nick Folk 24-yard field goal, 0:13. Titans 10–7. **Drive: 10 plays, 46 yards, 3:51.**

**Second quarter**

- TEN – Derrick Henry 5-yard run (Nick Folk kick), 10:22. Titans 17–7. **Drive: 8 plays, 77 yards, 4:19.**
- IND – Matt Gay 23-yard field goal, 7:39. Titans 17–10. **Drive: 8 plays, 70 yards, 2:43.**
- IND – Matt Gay 46-yard field goal, 0:04. Titans 17–13. **Drive: 6 plays, 16 yards, 0:39.**

**Third quarter**

- IND – Matt Gay 23-yard field goal, 4:57. Titans 17–16. **Drive: 19 plays, 70 yards, 10:03.**
- IND – Grant Stuard 18-yard return of blocked punt, 0:19. Colts 22–17.
- TEN – Amani Hooker defensive two point conversion, 0:19. Colts 22–19.

**Fourth quarter**

- IND – Matt Gay 28-yard field goal, 11:34. Colts 25–19. **Drive: 4 plays, 3 yards, 2:08.**
- TEN – DeAndre Hopkins 3-yard pass from Will Levis (kick failed), 5:26. Tied 25–25. **Drive: 11 plays, 75 yards, 6:08.**

**Overtime**

- TEN – Nick Folk 46-yard field goal, 4:19. Titans 28–25. **Drive: 10 plays, 48 yards, 5:41.**
- IND – Michael Pittman Jr. 4-yard pass from Gardner Minshew, 2:31. Colts 31–28. **Drive: 5 plays, 75 yards, 1:48.**

**Top passers**

- IND – Gardner Minshew – 26/42, 312 yards, 2 TD
- TEN – Will Levis – 16/33, 224 yards, TD

**Top rushers**

- IND – Zack Moss – 19 rushes, 51 yards
- TEN – Derrick Henry – 21 rushes, 102 yards, 2 TD

**Top receivers**

- IND – Michael Pittman Jr. – 11 receptions, 105 yards, TD
- TEN – DeAndre Hopkins – 5 receptions, 75 yards, TD

The Colts erased a 17–7 deficit and beat the Titans 31–28 in overtime, sweeping them for the first time since 2018.

==== Week 14: at Cincinnati Bengals ====
Week 14: Indianapolis Colts at Cincinnati Bengals – Game summary

Quarter	1	2	3	4	Total
Colts	0	14	0	0	**14**
**Bengals**	7	7	14	6	**34**

at Paycor Stadium, Cincinnati, Ohio

- Date: December 10
- Game time: 1:00 p.m. EST
- Game weather: Cloudy, 40 °F (4 °C)
- Game attendance: 65,981
- Referee: Shawn Hochuli
- TV announcers (CBS): Tom McCarthy, James Lofton, Jay Feely and Tiffany Blackmon
- Recap, Game Book

Game information

**First quarter**

- CIN – Chase Brown 54-yard pass from Jake Browning (Evan McPherson kick), 6:31. Bengals 7–0. **Drive: 4 plays, 92 yards, 2:11.**

**Second quarter**

- CIN – Joe Mixon 1-yard run (Evan McPherson kick), 10:18. Bengals 14–0. **Drive: 11 plays, 72 yards, 5:57.**
- IND – Mo Alie-Cox 2-yard pass from Gardner Minshew (kick failed), 1:56. Bengals 14–6. **Drive: 17 plays, 79 yards, 8:22.**
- IND – Ronnie Harrison 36-yard interception return (Gardner Minshew-Michael Pittman Jr. pass), 1:31. Tied 14–14.

**Third quarter**

- CIN – Tanner Hudson 11-yard pass from Jake Browning (Evan McPherson kick), 11:38. Bengals 21–14. **Drive: 6 plays, 75 yards, 3:22.**
- CIN – Jake Browning 1-yard run (Evan McPherson kick), 2:59. Bengals 28–14. **Drive: 11 plays, 71 yards, 6:33.**

**Fourth quarter**

- CIN – Evan McPherson 32-yard field goal, 11:14. Bengals 31–14. **Drive: 4 plays, 2 yards, 2:18.**
- CIN – Evan McPherson 35-yard field goal, 1:55. Bengals 34–14. **Drive: 6 plays, 18 yards, 3:16.**

**Top passers**

- IND – Gardner Minshew – 26/39, 240 yards, TD, INT
- CIN – Jake Browning – 18/24, 275 yards, 2 TD, INT

**Top rushers**

- IND – Zack Moss – 13 rushes, 28 yards
- CIN – Joe Mixon – 21 rushes, 79 yards, TD

**Top receivers**

- IND – Michael Pittman Jr. – 8 receptions, 95 yards
- CIN – Chase Brown – 3 receptions, 80 yards, TD

The Colts suffered their 4th consecutive loss in Cincinnati, and haven't won there since 2005.

==== Week 15: vs. Pittsburgh Steelers ====
Week 15: Pittsburgh Steelers at Indianapolis Colts – Game summary

Quarter	1	2	3	4	Total
Steelers	6	7	0	0	**13**
**Colts**	0	14	10	6	**30**

at Lucas Oil Stadium, Indianapolis, Indiana

- Date: December 16
- Game time: 4:30 p.m. EST
- Game weather: None (retractable roof closed)
- Game attendance: 64,171
- Referee: Adrian Hill
- TV announcers (WTTV/NFLN): Rich Eisen, Kurt Warner and Jamie Erdahl
- Recap, Game Book

The Colts erased a 13–0 deficit and upset the Steelers. It was their first win against the Steelers since 2008, and their first home win against them since 2005.

==== Week 16: at Atlanta Falcons ====
Week 16: Indianapolis Colts at Atlanta Falcons – Game summary

Quarter	1	2	3	4	Total
Colts	7	0	3	0	**10**
**Falcons**	7	6	7	9	**29**

at Mercedes-Benz Stadium, Atlanta, Georgia

- Date: December 24
- Game time: 1:00 p.m. EST
- Game weather: None (retractable roof closed)
- Game attendance: 69,221
- Referee: Alan Eck
- TV announcers (Fox): Adam Amin, Mark Schlereth and Kristina Pink
- Recap, Game Book

Game information

**First quarter**

- IND – Jonathan Taylor 1-yard run (Matt Gay kick), 9:24. Colts 7–0. **Drive: 13 plays, 75 yards, 5:36.**
- ATL – Kyle Pitts 24-yard pass from Taylor Heinicke (Younghoe Koo kick), 7:42. Tied 7–7. **Drive: 5 plays, 75 yards, 1:42.**

**Second quarter**

- ATL – Younghoe Koo 23-yard field goal, 3:23. Falcons 10–7. **Drive: 14 plays, 82 yards, 6:13.**
- ATL – Younghoe Koo 47-yard field goal, 0:05. Falcons 13–7. **Drive: 8 plays, 46 yards, 1:41.**

**Third quarter**

- ATL – Tyler Allgeier 31-yard run (Younghoe Koo kick), 11:13. Falcons 20–7. **Drive: 8 plays, 75 yards, 3:47.**
- IND – Matt Gay 33-yard field goal, 4:23. Falcons 20–10. **Drive: 12 plays, 60 yards, 6:50.**

**Fourth quarter**

- ATL – Younghoe Koo 41-yard field goal, 14:06. Falcons 23–10. **Drive: 12 plays, 52 yards, 5:17.**
- ATL – Younghoe Koo 35-yard field goal, 5:46. Falcons 26–10. **Drive: 6 plays, 33 yards, 2:11.**
- ATL – Younghoe Koo 25-yard field goal, 1:57. Falcons 29–10. **Drive: 6 plays, 11 yards, 2:52.**

**Top passers**

- IND – Gardner Minshew – 20/37, 201 yards, INT
- ATL – Taylor Heinicke – 23/33, 229 yards, TD

**Top rushers**

- IND – Jonathan Taylor – 18 rushes, 43 yards, TD
- ATL – Bijan Robinson – 12 rushes, 72 yards

**Top receivers**

- IND – Josh Downs – 6 receptions, 39 yards
- ATL – Bijan Robinson – 7 receptions, 50 yards

The Colts lost to the Falcons for the first time since 2011, and lost their first game at Atlanta since 1998.

==== Week 17: vs. Las Vegas Raiders ====
Week 17: Las Vegas Raiders at Indianapolis Colts – Game summary

Quarter	1	2	3	4	Total
Raiders	3	0	7	10	**20**
**Colts**	7	7	3	6	**23**

at Lucas Oil Stadium, Indianapolis, Indiana

- Date: December 31
- Game time: 1:00 p.m. EST
- Game weather: None (retractable roof closed)
- Game attendance: 65,538
- Referee: Shawn Smith
- TV announcers (CBS): Andrew Catalon, Tiki Barber, Matt Ryan and AJ Ross
- Recap, Game Book

Game information

**First quarter**

- IND – Jonathan Taylor 5-yard run (Matt Gay kick), 12:11. Colts 7–0. **Drive: 6 plays, 75 yards, 2:49.**
- LV – Daniel Carlson 40-yard field goal, 5:57. Colts 7–3. **Drive: 12 plays, 54 yards, 6:14.**

**Second quarter**

- IND – Alec Pierce 58-yard pass from Gardner Minshew (Matt Gay kick), 3:53. Colts 14–3. **Drive: 6 plays, 90 yards, 3:12.**

**Third quarter**

- LV – Davante Adams 4-yard pass from Aidan O'Connell (Daniel Carlson kick), 6:31. Colts 14–10. **Drive: 15 plays, 75 yards, 8:29.**
- IND – Matt Gay 38-yard field goal, 1:17. Colts 17–10. **Drive: 12 plays, 56 yards, 5:14.**

**Fourth quarter**

- IND – Matt Gay 33-yard field goal, 7:34. Colts 20–10. **Drive: 9 plays, 61 yards, 5:40.**
- LV – Daniel Carlson 33-yard field goal, 4:35. Colts 20–13. **Drive: 11 plays, 60 yards, 2:59.**
- IND – Matt Gay 45-yard field goal, 3:11. Colts 23–13. **Drive: 7 plays, 48 yards, 1:24.**
- LV – Davante Adams 1-yard pass from Aidan O'Connell (Daniel Carlson kick), 0:43. Colts 23–20. **Drive: 9 plays, 75 yards, 2:28.**

**Top passers**

- LV – Aidan O'Connell – 30/47, 299 yards, 2 TD
- IND – Gardner Minshew – 15/23, 224 yards, TD

**Top rushers**

- LV – Zamir White – 20 rushes, 71 yards
- IND – Jonathan Taylor – 21 rushes, 96 yards, TD

**Top receivers**

- LV – Davante Adams – 13 receptions, 126 yards, 2 TD
- IND – Michael Pittman Jr. – 5 receptions, 46 yards

The Colts beat the Raiders at home for the first time since 2013 when the Raiders were based in Oakland.

==== Week 18: vs. Houston Texans ====
Week 18: Houston Texans at Indianapolis Colts – Game summary

Quarter	1	2	3	4	Total
**Texans**	7	7	3	6	**23**
Colts	3	3	8	5	**19**

at Lucas Oil Stadium, Indianapolis, Indiana

- Date: January 6
- Game time: 8:15 p.m. EST
- Game weather: None (retractable roof closed)
- Game attendance: 65,925
- Referee: Bill Vinovich
- TV announcers (ESPN/ABC/ESPN+): Joe Buck, Troy Aikman and Lisa Salters
- Recap, Game Book

Game information

**First quarter**

- IND – Matt Gay 38-yard field goal, 9:15. Colts 3–0. **Drive: 11 plays, 56 yards, 5:45.**
- HOU – Nico Collins 75-yard pass from C. J. Stroud (Kaʻimi Fairbairn kick), 9:06. Texans 7–3. **Drive: 1 play, 75 yards, 0:09.**

**Second quarter**

- HOU – Andrew Beck 1-yard pass from C. J. Stroud (Kaʻimi Fairbairn kick), 1:57. Texans 14–3. **Drive: 8 plays, 57 yards, 4:26.**
- IND – Matt Gay 52-yard field goal, 0:35. Texans 14–6. **Drive: 6 plays, 41 yards, 1:22.**

**Third quarter**

- IND – Jonathan Taylor 49-yard run (Gardner Minshew–Mo Alie-Cox pass), 9:56. Tied 14–14. **Drive: 4 plays, 87 yards, 1:50.**
- HOU – Kaʻimi Fairbairn 51-yard field goal, 3:39. Texans 17–14. **Drive: 5 plays, 20 yards, 1:58.**

**Fourth quarter**

- IND – Matt Gay 35-yard field goal, 13:33. Tied 17–17. **Drive: 10 plays, 59 yards, 5:06.**
- HOU – Devin Singletary 3-yard run (kick failed), 6:20. Texans 23–17. **Drive: 12 plays, 73 yards, 7:13.**
- IND – Cameron Johnston run out of end zone for a safety, 0:01. Texans 23–19.

**Top passers**

- HOU – C. J. Stroud – 20/26, 264 yards, 2 TD
- IND – Gardner Minshew – 13/24, 141 yards

**Top rushers**

- HOU – Devin Singletary – 24 rushes, 63 yards, TD
- IND – Jonathan Taylor – 30 rushes, 188 yards, TD

**Top receivers**

- HOU – Nico Collins – 9 receptions, 195 yards, TD
- IND – Josh Downs – 3 receptions, 48 yards

The Colts extended their home losing streak to the Texans to 2 games.

=== Standings ===
==== Division ====
AFC South
	W	L	T	PCT	DIV	CONF	PF	PA	STK
^{(4)} Houston Texans	10	7	0	.588	4–2	7–5	377	353	W2
Jacksonville Jaguars	9	8	0	.529	4–2	6–6	377	371	L1
Indianapolis Colts	9	8	0	.529	3–3	7–5	396	415	L1
Tennessee Titans	6	11	0	.353	1–5	4–8	305	367	W1

==== Conference ====
AFC
#	Team	Division	W	L	T	PCT	DIV	CONF	SOS	SOV	STK
**Division leaders**
1	Baltimore Ravens	North	13	4	0	.765	3–3	8–4	.543	.529	L1
2 (Note: Buffalo claimed the No. 2 seed over Kansas City based on head-to-head victory.) (Note: Buffalo finished ahead of Miami in the AFC East based on head-to-head sweep.)	Buffalo Bills	East	11	6	0	.647	4–2	7–5	.471	.471	W5
3	Kansas City Chiefs	West	11	6	0	.647	4–2	9–3	.481	.428	W2
4	Houston Texans	South	10	7	0	.588	4–2	7–5	.474	.465	W2
**Wild cards**
5 (Note: Cleveland claimed the No. 5 seed over Miami based on conference record.)	Cleveland Browns	North	11	6	0	.647	3–3	8–4	.536	.513	L1
6	Miami Dolphins	East	11	6	0	.647	4–2	7–5	.450	.358	L2
7	Pittsburgh Steelers	North	10	7	0	.588	5–1	7–5	.540	.571	W3
**Did not qualify for the postseason**
8 (Note: Cincinnati finished ahead of Jacksonville based on head-to-head victory. Division tie break was initially used to eliminate Indianapolis (see below).)	Cincinnati Bengals	North	9	8	0	.529	1–5	4–8	.574	.536	W1
9 (Note: Jacksonville finished ahead of Indianapolis based on head-to-head sweep.)	Jacksonville Jaguars	South	9	8	0	.529	4–2	6–6	.533	.477	L1
10	Indianapolis Colts	South	9	8	0	.529	3–3	7–5	.491	.444	L1
11 (Note: Las Vegas finished ahead of Denver based on head-to-head sweep.)	Las Vegas Raiders	West	8	9	0	.471	4–2	6–6	.488	.426	W1
12	Denver Broncos	West	8	9	0	.471	3–3	5–7	.488	.485	L1
13	New York Jets	East	7	10	0	.412	2–4	4–8	.502	.454	W1
14	Tennessee Titans	South	6	11	0	.353	1–5	4–8	.522	.422	W1
15	Los Angeles Chargers	West	5	12	0	.294	1–5	3–9	.529	.388	L5
16	New England Patriots	East	4	13	0	.235	2–4	4–8	.522	.529	L2
**Tiebreakers** (Note: When breaking ties for three or more teams under the NFL's rules, they are first broken within divisions, then comparing only the highest ranked remaining team from each division.)
