= 2024 Indianapolis Colts season =

72nd season in franchise history

- Owner: Jim Irsay
- General manager: Chris Ballard
- Head coach: Shane Steichen
- Home stadium: Lucas Oil Stadium

Results
- Record: 8–9
- Division place: 2nd AFC South
- Playoffs: Did not qualify
- All-Pros: LG Quenton Nelson (2nd team); LB Zaire Franklin (2nd team)
- Pro Bowlers: RB Jonathan Taylor; G Quenton Nelson; ILB Zaire Franklin

Uniform
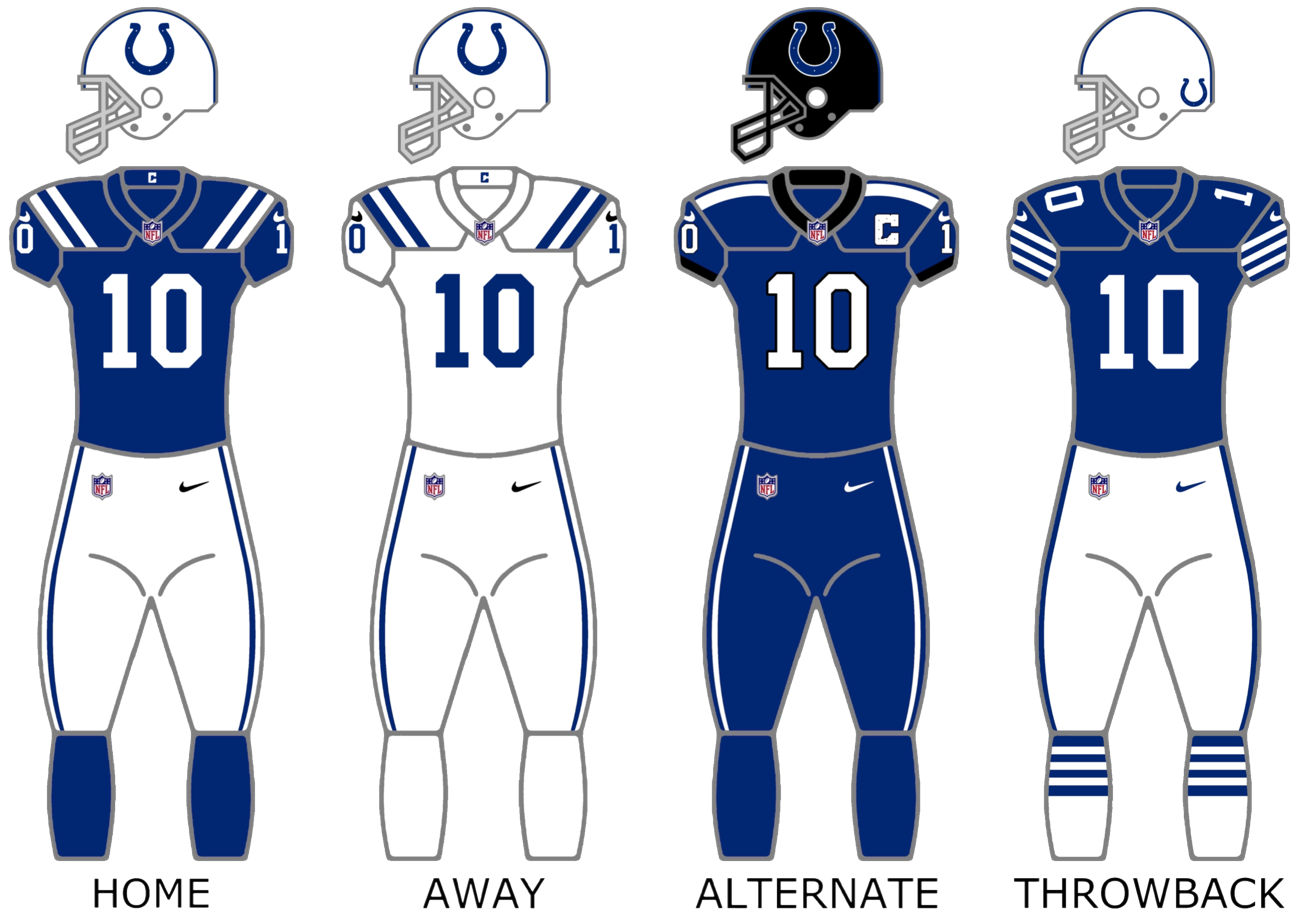

The 2024 season was the Indianapolis Colts' 72nd in the National Football League (NFL), their 41st in Indianapolis, and their 17th playing their home games at Lucas Oil Stadium. It was their eighth under the leadership of general manager Chris Ballard and the second under head coach Shane Steichen. They failed to improve on their 9–8 record from last year and end their nine-year AFC South title drought after a Week 15 blowout loss to the Denver Broncos. They were eliminated from playoff contention following a Week 17 upset loss to the New York Giants, who before the game had the worst record in the league. The Colts finished their season with an 8–9 record.

== Draft ==
2024 Indianapolis Colts draft selections
Round	Selection	Player	Position	College	Notes
1	15	Laiatu Latu	DE	UCLA	
2	46	Traded to the Carolina Panthers (Note: The Colts traded a second-round selection (46th overall) to the Carolina Panthers in exchange for a second-round selection and two fifth-round selections (52nd, 142nd and 155th overall).)			
2	52	Adonai Mitchell	WR	Texas	From Rams via Panthers
3	79	Matt Goncalves	OT	Pittsburgh	From Jaguars via Cardinals (Note: The Colts traded third- and sixth-round selections (82nd and 191st overall) to the Arizona Cardinals in exchange for a third-round selection (79th overall).)
3	82	Traded to the Arizona Cardinals			
4	117	Tanor Bortolini	C	Wisconsin	
5	142	Anthony Gould	WR	Oregon State	From Titans via Panthers
5	151	Jaylon Carlies	LB	Missouri	
5	155	Traded to the Philadelphia Eagles (Note: The Colts traded a fifth-round selection (155th overall) to the Philadelphia Eagles in exchange for fifth- and sixth-round selections (164th and 201st overall).)			From Steelers via Panthers
5	164	Jaylin Simpson	S	Auburn	From Lions via Eagles
6	191	Traded to the Arizona Cardinals			
6	201	Micah Abraham	CB	Marshall	From Buccaneers via Eagles
7	234	Jonah Laulu	DT	Oklahoma	

2024 Indianapolis Colts undrafted free agents
Name	Position	College	Ref.
Jason Bean	QB/WR	Kansas	
Trent Pennix	RB	NC State	
Spencer Shrader	K	Notre Dame	
Kedon Slovis	QB	BYU	
Dalton Tucker	G	Marshall	
Xavier White	WR	Texas Tech	
Craig Young	LB	Kansas	
Clay Fields III	CB	Chattanooga	
Derek Slywka	WR	Ithaca	

Draft trades

== Personnel ==
=== Staff / Coaches ===
2024 Indianapolis Colts staff
Front office: Owner/CEO – Jim Irsay; Vice chairman/co-owner – Carlie Irsay-Gordon; Vice chairman/co-owner – Casey Foyt; Vice chairman/co-owner – Kalen Jackson; General manager – Chris Ballard; Assistant general manager – Ed Dodds; Director of player personnel – Kevin Rogers Jr.; Director of football administration – Mike Bluem; Chief personnel executive – Morocco Brown; Director of pro scouting – Jon Shaw; Assistant director of pro scouting – Joey Elliott; Director of college scouting – Matt Terpening; Assistant director of college scouting – Jamie Moore; Senior player personnel scout – Todd Vasvari; Director of football analytics – Greg Starek; Head coaches: Head coach – Shane Steichen; Offensive coaches: Offensive coordinator – Jim Bob Cooter; Passing game coordinator – Alex Tanney; Quarterbacks – Cameron Turner; Running backs – DeAndre Smith; Wide receivers – Reggie Wayne; Tight ends – Tom Manning; Offensive line – Tony Sparano Jr.; Assistant offensive line – Chris Watt; Offensive quality control/wide receivers – Brian Bratton	Defensive coaches: Defensive coordinator – Gus Bradley; Defensive line – Charlie Partridge; Senior assistant defensive line – Matt Raich; Linebackers/run game coordinator – Richard Smith; Assistant linebackers – Cato June; Defensive backs – Ron Milus; Assistant defensive backs – Justin Hamilton; Defensive quality control – Brent Jackson; Special teams coaches: Special teams coordinator – Brian Mason; Assistant special teams – Joe Hastings; Strength and conditioning: Director of sports performance – Mike Minnis; Senior head strength and conditioning – Richard Howell; Assistant strength and conditioning – Zane Fakes; Applied sports science/conditioning – Doug McKenney; Functional movement therapist/conditioning – Sam Khym

=== Final roster ===
2024 Indianapolis Colts roster
Quarterbacks (QB): 4 Sam Ehlinger; 15 Joe Flacco; 5 Anthony Richardson; Running backs (RB): 31 Tyler Goodson; 27 Trey Sermon; 28 Jonathan Taylor; Wide receivers (WR): 1 Josh Downs; 16 Ashton Dulin; 6 Anthony Gould; 10 Adonai Mitchell; 14 Alec Pierce; 11 Michael Pittman Jr.; Tight ends (TE): 81 Mo Alie-Cox; 83 Kylen Granson; 86 Will Mallory; 85 Drew Ogletree	Offensive linemen (OL): 60 Tanor Bortolini C; 73 Blake Freeland T; 64 Mark Glowinski G; 71 Matt Goncalves T; 78 Ryan Kelly C; 56 Quenton Nelson G; 63 Danny Pinter C/G; 79 Bernhard Raimann T; 68 Dalton Tucker G; Defensive linemen (DL): 95 Adetomiwa Adebawore DT; 96 Taven Bryan DT; 99 DeForest Buckner DT; 98 Raekwon Davis DT; 55 Isaiah Land DE; 97 Laiatu Latu DE; 94 Tyquan Lewis DE; 54 Dayo Odeyingbo DE; 51 Kwity Paye DE; 90 Grover Stewart DT	Linebackers (LB): 57 Jaylon Carlies OLB; 44 Zaire Franklin MLB; 48 Ronnie Harrison OLB; 59 Cameron McGrone OLB; 50 Segun Olubi MLB; 45 E. J. Speed OLB; 41 Grant Stuard OLB; Defensive backs (DB): 32 Julian Blackmon FS; 29 JuJu Brents CB; 20 Nick Cross SS; 40 Jaylon Jones CB; 34 David Long CB; 23 Kenny Moore CB; 25 Rodney Thomas II FS/SS; 33 Samuel Womack CB; Special teams (ST): 7 Matt Gay K; 46 Luke Rhodes LS; 8 Rigoberto Sanchez P	Practice squad: 36 Salvon Ahmed RB; 58 Austin Ajiake MLB; 47 Liam Anderson OLB; 12 Jason Bean QB; 67 Mason Brooks T; 42 Marcel Dabo SS (IPP); 37 Tre Flowers CB (PS/I); 26 Evan Hull RB; 36 Alex Johnson CB; 65 Atonio Mafi G; 49 Sean McKeon TE; 2 D. J. Montgomery WR; 74 Durell Nchami DE; 84 Albert Okwuegbunam TE; 69 Pheldarius Payne DT; 66 Josh Sills G; 17 Laquon Treadwell WR; 38 Michael Tutsie FS; Reserve: 66 Ryan Coll C (IR); 43 Trevor Denbow SS (IR); 52 Samson Ebukam DE (IR/DFR); 62 Wesley French C (IR); 75 Will Fries G (IR); 31 Daniel Scott SS (IR); 72 Braden Smith T (NF-Ill.); 9 Juwann Winfree WR (IR); 80 Jelani Woods TE (IR); Rookies in italics 53 active, 9 reserve, 16 practice squad (2 exempt)

== Preseason ==
The Colts' preseason opponents and preliminary schedule were announced on May 15, in conjunction with the release of the regular season schedule.

Week	Date	Opponent	Result	Record	Venue	Recap
1	August 11	Denver Broncos	L 30–34	0–1	Lucas Oil Stadium	Recap
2	August 17	Arizona Cardinals	W 21–13	1–1	Lucas Oil Stadium	Recap
3	August 22	at Cincinnati Bengals	W 27–14	2–1	Paycor Stadium	Recap

== Regular season ==
=== Schedule ===
Week	Date	Opponent	Result	Record	Venue	Recap
1	September 8	**Houston Texans**	**L** 27–29	0–1	Lucas Oil Stadium	Recap
2	September 15	at Green Bay Packers	**L** 10–16	0–2	Lambeau Field	Recap
3	September 22	Chicago Bears	**W** 21–16	1–2	Lucas Oil Stadium	Recap
4	September 29	Pittsburgh Steelers	**W** 27–24	2–2	Lucas Oil Stadium	Recap
5	October 6	at **Jacksonville Jaguars**	**L** 34–37	2–3	EverBank Stadium	Recap
6	October 13	at **Tennessee Titans**	**W** 20–17	3–3	Nissan Stadium	Recap
7	October 20	Miami Dolphins	**W** 16–10	4–3	Lucas Oil Stadium	Recap
8	October 27	at **Houston Texans**	**L** 20–23	4–4	NRG Stadium	Recap
9	November 3	at Minnesota Vikings	**L** 13–21	4–5	U.S. Bank Stadium	Recap
10	November 10	Buffalo Bills	**L** 20–30	4–6	Lucas Oil Stadium	Recap
11	November 17	at New York Jets	**W** 28–27	5–6	MetLife Stadium	Recap
12	November 24	Detroit Lions	**L** 6–24	5–7	Lucas Oil Stadium	Recap
13	December 1	at New England Patriots	**W** 25–24	6–7	Gillette Stadium	Recap
14	Bye					
15	December 15	at Denver Broncos	**L** 13–31	6–8	Empower Field at Mile High	Recap
16	December 22	**Tennessee Titans**	**W** 38–30	7–8	Lucas Oil Stadium	Recap
17	December 29	at New York Giants	**L** 33–45	7–9	MetLife Stadium	Recap
18	January 5	**Jacksonville Jaguars**	**W** 26–23 (OT)	8–9	Lucas Oil Stadium	Recap

Note: Intra-division opponents are in bold text.

=== Game summaries ===
==== Week 1: vs. Houston Texans ====
Week 1: Houston Texans at Indianapolis Colts – Game summary

Quarter	1	2	3	4	Total
**Texans**	6	6	3	14	**29**
Colts	7	0	6	14	**27**

at Lucas Oil Stadium, Indianapolis, Indiana

- Date: September 8
- Game time: 1:00 p.m. EDT
- Game weather: Mostly sunny, 63 °F (17 °C) (retractable roof open)
- Game attendance: 65,306
- Referee: John Hussey
- TV announcers (CBS): Andrew Catalon, Tiki Barber, Jason McCourty and AJ Ross
- Recap, Game Book

Game information

**First quarter**

- HOU – Kaʻimi Fairbairn 51-yard field goal, 6:44. Texans 3–0. **Drive: 8 plays, 21 yards, 4:56.**
- IND – Alec Pierce 60-yard pass from Anthony Richardson (Spencer Shrader kick), 5:12. Colts 7–3. **Drive: 3 plays, 73 yards, 1:32.**
- HOU – Kaʻimi Fairbairn 50-yard field goal, 1:37. Colts 7–6. **Drive: 7 plays, 38 yards, 3:35.**

**Second quarter**

- HOU – Stefon Diggs 9-yard pass from C. J. Stroud (run failed) 11:31. Texans 12–7. **Drive: 7 plays, 81 yards, 3:29.**

**Third quarter**

- HOU – Kaʻimi Fairbairn 51-yard field goal, 10:55. Texans 15–7. **Drive: 9 plays, 37 yards, 4:05.**
- IND – Jonathan Taylor 5-yard run (run failed), 5:40. Texans 15–13. **Drive: 1 play, 5 yards, 0:03.**

**Fourth quarter**

- HOU – Joe Mixon 3-yard run (Kaʻimi Fairbairn kick), 13:41. Texans 22–13. **Drive: 13 plays, 70 yards, 6:59.**
- IND – Ashton Dulin 54-yard pass from Anthony Richardson (Spencer Shrader kick), 12:12. Texans 22–20. **Drive: 4 plays, 70 yards, 1:29.**
- HOU – Stefon Diggs 2-yard pass from C. J. Stroud (Kaʻimi Fairbairn kick), 4:42. Texans 29–20. **Drive: 11 plays, 70 yards, 7:30.**
- IND – Anthony Richardson 3-yard run (Spencer Shrader kick), 2:14. Texans 29–27. **Drive: 8 plays, 68 yards, 2:28.**

**Top passers**

- HOU – C. J. Stroud – 24/32, 234 yards, 2 TD
- IND – Anthony Richardson – 9/19, 212 yards, 2 TD, INT

**Top rushers**

- HOU – Joe Mixon – 30 rushes, 159 yards, TD
- IND – Anthony Richardson – 6 rushes, 56 yards, TD

**Top receivers**

- HOU – Nico Collins – 6 receptions, 117 yards
- IND – Alec Pierce – 3 receptions, 125 yards, TD

With the loss, the Colts have now gone 11 consecutive seasons without a Week 1 victory. Their most recent opening-week victory came in 2013.

==== Week 2: at Green Bay Packers ====
Week 2: Indianapolis Colts at Green Bay Packers – Game summary

Quarter	1	2	3	4	Total
Colts	0	0	3	7	**10**
**Packers**	10	0	3	3	**16**

at Lambeau Field, Green Bay, Wisconsin

- Date: September 15
- Game time: 1:00 p.m. EDT/12:00 p.m. CDT
- Game weather: Sunny, 85 °F (29 °C)
- Game attendance: 77,827
- Referee: Shawn Hochuli
- TV announcers (Fox): Joe Davis, Greg Olsen and Pam Oliver
- Recap, Game Book

Game information

**First quarter**

- GB – Brayden Narveson 46-yard field goal, 10:30. Packers 3–0. **Drive: 8 plays, 42 yards, 4:30.**
- GB – Dontayvion Wicks 14-yard pass from Malik Willis (Brayden Narveson kick), 3:18. Packers 10–0. **Drive: 11 plays, 82 yards, 6:21.**

**Second quarter**

- No scoring plays.

**Third quarter**

- GB – Brayden Narveson 42-yard field goal, 8:25. Packers 13–0. **Drive: 7 plays, 23 yards, 3:55.**
- IND – Matt Gay 34-yard field goal, 4:32. Packers 13–3. **Drive: 7 plays, 54 yards, 3:53.**

**Fourth quarter**

- GB – Brayden Narveson 34-yard field goal, 10:50. Packers 16–3. **Drive: 7 plays, 44 yards, 3:22.**
- IND – Alec Pierce 4-yard pass from Anthony Richardson (Matt Gay kick), 1:47. Packers 16–10. **Drive: 12 plays, 65 yards, 2:23.**

**Top passers**

- IND – Anthony Richardson – 17/34, 204 yards, TD, 3 INT
- GB – Malik Willis – 12/14, 122 yards, TD

**Top rushers**

- IND – Jonathan Taylor – 12 rushes, 103 yards
- GB – Josh Jacobs – 32 rushes, 151 yards

**Top receivers**

- IND – Alec Pierce – 5 receptions, 56 yards, TD
- GB – Romeo Doubs – 3 receptions, 62 yards

With the loss (their first to the Packers since 2008, the Colts fell to 0–2 for the first time since 2017. The Colts defense was gashed for 261 rushing yards by a Packers offense missing starting quarterback Jordan Love.

==== Week 3: vs. Chicago Bears ====
Week 3: Chicago Bears at Indianapolis Colts – Game summary

Quarter	1	2	3	4	Total
Bears	0	0	3	13	**16**
**Colts**	0	7	7	7	**21**

at Lucas Oil Stadium, Indianapolis, Indiana

- Date: September 22
- Game time: 1:00 p.m. EDT
- Game weather: None (retractable roof closed)
- Game attendance: 66,624
- Referee: Adrian Hill
- TV announcers (CBS): Andrew Catalon, Tiki Barber, Jason McCourty and AJ Ross
- Recap, Game Book

Game information

**First quarter**

- No scoring plays.

**Second quarter**

- IND – Jonathan Taylor 29-yard run (Matt Gay kick), 8:19. Colts 7–0. **Drive: 3 plays, 70 yards, 1:16.**

**Third quarter**

- CHI – Cairo Santos 53-yard field goal, 12:51. Colts 7–3. **Drive: 5 plays, 18 yards, 2:01.**
- IND – Trey Sermon 1-yard run (Matt Gay kick), 0:21. Colts 14–3. **Drive: 9 plays, 80 yards, 5:30.**

**Fourth quarter**

- CHI – Rome Odunze 1-yard pass from Caleb Williams (pass failed), 8:21. Colts 14–9. **Drive: 13 plays, 70 yards, 7:00.**
- IND – Jonathan Taylor 1-yard run (Matt Gay kick), 5:22. Colts 21–9. **Drive: 4 plays, 16 yards, 1:24.**
- CHI – Cole Kmet 6-yard pass from Caleb Williams (Cairo Santos kick), 2:01. Colts 21–16. **Drive: 12 plays, 70 yards, 3:21.**

**Top passers**

- CHI – Caleb Williams – 33/52, 363 yards, 2 TD, 2 INT
- IND – Anthony Richardson – 10/20, 167 yards, 2 INT

**Top rushers**

- CHI – Roschon Johnson – 8 rushes, 30 yards
- IND – Jonathan Taylor – 23 rushes, 110 yards, 2 TD

**Top receivers**

- CHI – Rome Odunze – 6 receptions, 112 yards, TD
- IND – Alec Pierce – 1 reception, 44 yards

With the win (their third straight over the Bears), the Colts improved to 1–2

==== Week 4: vs. Pittsburgh Steelers ====
Week 4: Pittsburgh Steelers at Indianapolis Colts – Game summary

Quarter	1	2	3	4	Total
Steelers	0	3	7	14	**24**
**Colts**	14	3	0	10	**27**

at Lucas Oil Stadium, Indianapolis, Indiana

- Date: September 29
- Game time: 1:00 p.m. EDT
- Game weather: None (retractable roof closed)
- Game attendance: 66,376
- Referee: Land Clark
- TV announcers (CBS): Spero Dedes, Adam Archuleta and Aditi Kinkhabwala
- Recap, Game Book

Game information

**First quarter**

- IND – Jonathan Taylor 2-yard run (Matt Gay kick), 12:02. Colts 7–0. **Drive: 8 plays, 70 yards, 2:59.**
- IND – Josh Downs 4-yard pass from Joe Flacco (Matt Gay kick), 2:34. Colts 14–0. **Drive: 9 plays, 86 yards, 4:45.**

**Second quarter**

- IND – Matt Gay 33-yard field goal, 12:31. Colts 17–0. **Drive: 9 plays, 25 yards, 2:57.**
- PIT – Chris Boswell 50-yard field goal, 0:00. Colts 17–3. **Drive: 8 plays, 44 yards, 1:14.**

**Third quarter**

- PIT – Justin Fields 5-yard run (Chris Boswell kick), 2:53. Colts 17–10. **Drive: 6 plays, 56 yards, 2:56.**

**Fourth quarter**

- IND – Drew Ogletree 15-yard pass from Joe Flacco (Matt Gay kick), 14:43. Colts 24–10. **Drive: 10 plays, 70 yards, 3:10.**
- PIT – Justin Fields 2-yard run (Chris Boswell kick), 11:23. Colts 24–17. **Drive: 8 plays, 70 yards, 3:20.**
- IND – Matt Gay 35-yard field goal, 6:03. Colts 27–17. **Drive: 10 plays, 54 yards, 5:20.**
- PIT – Pat Freiermuth 8-yard pass from Justin Fields (Chris Boswell kick), 3:40. Colts 27–24. **Drive: 7 plays, 70 yards, 2:23.**

**Top passers**

- PIT – Justin Fields – 22/34, 312 yards, TD
- IND – Joe Flacco – 16/26, 168 yards, 2 TD

**Top rushers**

- PIT – Justin Fields – 10 rushes, 55 yards, 2 TD
- IND – Jonathan Taylor – 21 rushes, 88 yards, TD

**Top receivers**

- PIT – George Pickens – 7 receptions, 113 yards
- IND – Michael Pittman Jr. – 6 receptions, 113 yards

For the second straight season, the Colts defeated the Steelers at home, improving to 2–2. Anthony Richardson left the game in the 1st quarter and was replaced by Joe Flacco.

==== Week 5: at Jacksonville Jaguars ====
Week 5: Indianapolis Colts at Jacksonville Jaguars – Game summary

Quarter	1	2	3	4	Total
Colts	7	3	0	24	**34**
**Jaguars**	0	13	7	17	**37**

at EverBank Stadium, Jacksonville, Florida

- Date: October 6
- Game time: 1:00 p.m. EDT
- Game weather: Rain, 74 °F (23 °C)
- Game attendance: 60,214
- Referee: Carl Cheffers
- TV announcers (CBS): Spero Dedes, Adam Archuleta and Aditi Kinkhabwala
- Recap, Game Book

Game information

**First quarter**

- IND – Michael Pittman Jr. 1-yard pass from Joe Flacco (Matt Gay kick), 8:49. Colts 7–0. **Drive: 12 plays, 71 yards, 6:11.**

**Second quarter**

- JAX – Cam Little 23-yard field goal, 8:57. Colts 7–3. **Drive: 14 plays, 84 yards, 7:46.**
- JAX – Brian Thomas Jr. 85-yard pass from Trevor Lawrence (Cam Little kick), 7:02. Jaguars 10–7. **Drive: 1 play, 85 yards, 0:10.**
- IND – Matt Gay 30-yard field goal, 1:44. Tied 10–10. **Drive: 12 plays, 58 yards, 5:18.**
- JAX – Cam Little 30-yard field goal, 0:04. Jaguars 13–10. **Drive: 1 play, 0 yards, 0:02.**

**Third quarter**

- JAX – Tank Bigsby 19-yard run (Cam Little kick), 7:13. Jaguars 20–10. **Drive: 1 play, 19 yards, 0:08.**

**Fourth quarter**

- IND – Mo Alie-Cox 18-yard pass from Joe Flacco (Matt Gay kick), 14:54. Jaguars 20–17. **Drive: 15 plays, 70 yards, 7:19.**
- JAX – Brenton Strange 4-yard pass from Trevor Lawrence (Cam Little kick), 9:59. Jaguars 27–17. **Drive: 7 plays, 70 yards, 4:55.**
- IND – Matt Gay 37-yard field goal, 6:00. Jaguars 27–20. **Drive: 8 plays, 51 yards, 3:59.**
- JAX – Tank Bigsby 65-yard run (Cam Little kick), 5:09. Jaguars 34–20. **Drive: 2 plays, 70 yards, 0:51.**
- IND – Trey Sermon 1-yard run (Matt Gay kick), 4:27. Jaguars 34–27. **Drive: 3 plays, 70 yards, 0:42.**
- IND – Alec Pierce 65-yard pass from Joe Flacco (Matt Gay kick), 2:40. Tied 34–34. **Drive: 2 plays, 77 yards, 0:45.**
- JAX – Cam Little 49-yard field goal, 0:17. Jaguars 37–34. **Drive: 8 plays, 39 yards, 2:23.**

**Top passers**

- IND – Joe Flacco – 33/44, 355 yards, 3 TD
- JAX – Trevor Lawrence – 28/34, 371 yards, 2 TD, INT

**Top rushers**

- IND – Trey Sermon – 10 rushes, 38 yards, TD
- JAX – Tank Bigsby – 13 rushes, 101 yards, 2 TD

**Top receivers**

- IND – Alec Pierce – 3 receptions, 134 yards, TD
- JAX – Brian Thomas Jr. – 5 receptions, 122 yards, TD

With the loss, the Colts have now gone 10 consecutive seasons without winning at Jacksonville. Their most recent win at Jacksonville came in 2014.

==== Week 6: at Tennessee Titans ====
Week 6: Indianapolis Colts at Tennessee Titans – Game summary

Quarter	1	2	3	4	Total
**Colts**	7	3	0	10	**20**
Titans	7	3	7	0	**17**

at Nissan Stadium, Nashville, Tennessee

- Date: October 13
- Game time: 1:00 p.m. EDT/12:00 p.m. CDT
- Game weather: Sunny, 76 °F (24 °C)
- Game attendance: 64,302
- Referee: Brad Rogers
- TV announcers (CBS): Spero Dedes, Adam Archuleta and Aditi Kinkhabwala
- Recap, Game Book

Game information

**First quarter**

- IND – Josh Downs 22-yard pass from Joe Flacco (Matt Gay kick), 11:17. Colts 7–0. **Drive: 10 plays, 70 yards, 3:43.**
- TEN – Nick Westbrook-Ikhine 9-yard pass from Will Levis (Nick Folk kick), 6:51. Tied 7–7. **Drive: 3 plays, 27 yards, 1:31.**

**Second quarter**

- TEN – Nick Folk 44-yard field goal, 11:09. Colts 10–7. **Drive: 15 plays, 56 yards, 9:02.**
- IND – Matt Gay 26-yard field goal, 0:19. Tied 10–10. **Drive: 10 plays, 63 yards, 3:20.**

**Third quarter**

- TEN – Tony Pollard 23-yard run (Nick Folk kick), 6:19. Titans 17–10. **Drive: 14 plays, 70 yards, 8:41.**

**Fourth quarter**

- IND – Matt Gay 22-yard field goal, 14:57. Titans 17–13. **Drive: 15 plays, 66 yards, 6:22.**
- IND – Michael Pittman Jr. 10-yard pass from Joe Flacco (Matt Gay kick), 7:27. Colts 20–17. **Drive: 11 plays, 75 yards, 5:23.**

**Top passers**

- IND – Joe Flacco – 22/38, 189 yards, 2 TD, INT
- TEN – Will Levis – 16/27, 95 yards, TD, INT

**Top rushers**

- IND – Tyler Goodson – 8 rushes, 51 yards
- TEN – Tony Pollard – 17 rushes, 93 yards, TD

**Top receivers**

- IND – Josh Downs – 7 receptions, 66 yards, TD
- TEN – DeAndre Hopkins – 4 receptions, 54 yards

This was the Colts' third straight win over the Titans, their longest winning streak against them since 2018–19.

==== Week 7: vs. Miami Dolphins ====
Week 7: Miami Dolphins at Indianapolis Colts – Game summary

Quarter	1	2	3	4	Total
Dolphins	7	3	0	0	**10**
**Colts**	0	3	7	6	**16**

at Lucas Oil Stadium, Indianapolis, Indiana

- Date: October 20
- Game time: 1:00 p.m. EDT
- Game weather: None (retractable roof closed)
- Game attendance: 66,299
- Referee: Craig Wrolstad
- TV announcers (Fox): Kevin Kugler, Daryl Johnston and Laura Okmin
- Recap, Game Book

Game information

**First quarter**

- MIA – Jonnu Smith 10-yard pass from Tyler Huntley (Jason Sanders kick), 5:56. Dolphins 7–0. **Drive: 11 plays, 58 yards, 5:51.**

**Second quarter**

- MIA – Jason Sanders 33-yard field goal, 0:22. Dolphins 10–0. **Drive: 9 plays, 65 yards, 2:30.**
- IND – Matt Gay 52-yard field goal, 0:00. Dolphins 10–3. **Drive: 4 plays, 36 yards, 0:22.**

**Third quarter**

- IND – Tyler Goodson 7-yard run (Matt Gay kick), 9:08. Tied 10–10. **Drive: 4 plays, 28 yards, 2:25.**

**Fourth quarter**

- IND – Matt Gay 22-yard field goal, 8:41. Colts 13–10. **Drive: 12 plays, 69 yards, 6:37.**
- IND – Matt Gay 38-yard field goal, 1:51. Colts 16–10. **Drive: 9 plays, 36 yards, 3:23.**

**Top passers**

- MIA – Tyler Huntley – 7/13, 87 yards, TD
- IND – Anthony Richardson – 10/24, 129 yards

**Top rushers**

- MIA – De'Von Achane – 15 rushes, 77 yards
- IND – Anthony Richardson – 14 rushes, 56 yards

**Top receivers**

- MIA – Jonnu Smith – 7 receptions, 96 yards, TD
- IND – Michael Pittman Jr. – 3 receptions, 63 yards

==== Week 8: at Houston Texans ====
Week 8: Indianapolis Colts at Houston Texans – Game summary

Quarter	1	2	3	4	Total
Colts	10	0	3	7	**20**
**Texans**	3	14	3	3	**23**

at NRG Stadium, Houston, Texas

- Date: October 27
- Game time: 1:00 p.m. EDT/12:00 p.m. CDT
- Game weather: None (retractable roof closed)
- Game attendance: 71,380
- Referee: Brad Allen
- TV announcers (CBS): Andrew Catalon, Tiki Barber and AJ Ross
- Recap, Game Book

Game information

**First quarter**

- HOU – Kaʻimi Fairbairn 35-yard field goal, 11:15. Texans 3–0. **Drive: 9 plays, 41 yards, 3:45.**
- IND – Matt Gay 46-yard field goal, 10:00. Tied 3–3. **Drive: 6 plays, 12 yards, 1:15.**
- IND – Josh Downs 69-yard pass from Anthony Richardson (Matt Gay kick), 0:50. Colts 10–3. **Drive: 4 plays, 81 yards, 2:12.**

**Second quarter**

- HOU – Joe Mixon 14-yard run (Kaʻimi Fairbairn kick), 10:04. Tied 10–10. **Drive: 10 plays, 70 yards, 5:46.**
- HOU – Tank Dell 7-yard pass from C. J. Stroud (Kaʻimi Fairbairn kick), 0:17. Texans 17–10. **Drive: 1 play, 7 yards, 0:06.**

**Third quarter**

- HOU – Kaʻimi Fairbairn 35-yard field goal, 7:52. Texans 20–10. **Drive: 8 plays, 76 yards, 3:27.**
- IND – Matt Gay 37-yard field goal, 2:01. Texans 20–13. **Drive: 10 plays, 52 yards, 5:51.**

**Fourth quarter**

- HOU – Kaʻimi Fairbairn 34-yard field goal, 12:21. Texans 23–13. **Drive: 9 plays, 54 yards, 4:40.**
- IND – Jonathan Taylor 1-yard run (Matt Gay kick), 8:32. Texans 23–20. **Drive: 11 plays, 70 yards, 3:49.**

**Top passers**

- IND – Anthony Richardson – 10/32, 175 yards, TD, INT
- HOU – C. J. Stroud – 25/37, 285 yards, TD

**Top rushers**

- IND – Jonathan Taylor – 20 rushes, 105 yards, TD
- HOU – Joe Mixon – 25 rushes, 102 yards, TD

**Top receiver**

- IND – Josh Downs – 4 receptions, 109 yards, TD
- HOU – Stefon Diggs – 5 receptions, 81 yards

The Colts were swept by the Texans for only the second time in franchise history (after 2016).

==== Week 9: at Minnesota Vikings ====
Week 9: Indianapolis Colts at Minnesota Vikings – Game summary

Quarter	1	2	3	4	Total
Colts	0	7	0	6	**13**
**Vikings**	0	0	14	7	**21**

at U.S. Bank Stadium, Minneapolis, Minnesota

- Date: November 3
- Game time: 8:20 p.m. EST/7:20 p.m. CST
- Game weather: None (indoor stadium)
- Game attendance: 66,954
- Referee: Shawn Smith
- TV announcers (NBC): Mike Tirico, Cris Collinsworth and Melissa Stark
- Recap, Game Book

Game information

**First quarter**

- No scoring plays.

**Second quarter**

- IND – Kenny Moore II 38-yard fumble return (Matt Gay kick), 10:56. Colts 7–0.

**Third quarter**

- MIN – Jordan Addison 4-yard pass from Sam Darnold (Will Reichard kick), 10:23. Tied 7–7. **Drive: 9 plays, 70 yards, 4:37.**
- MIN – Jalen Nailor 7-yard pass from Sam Darnold (Will Reichard kick), 2:49. Vikings 14–7. **Drive: 9 plays, 80 yards, 5:04.**

**Fourth quarter**

- IND – Matt Gay 42-yard field goal, 12:41. Vikings 14–10. **Drive: 4 plays, 2 yards, 1:32.**
- MIN – Josh Oliver 14-yard pass from Sam Darnold (Will Reichard kick), 2:05. Vikings 21–10. **Drive: 8 plays, 60 yards, 3:15.**
- IND – Matt Gay 54-yard field goal, 0:28. Vikings 21–13. **Drive: 6 plays, 34 yards, 1:37.**

**Top passers**

- IND – Joe Flacco – 16/27, 179 yards, INT
- MIN – Sam Darnold – 28/34, 290 yards, 3 TD, 2 INT

**Top rushers**

- IND – Jonathan Taylor – 13 rushes, 48 yards
- MIN – Aaron Jones – 21 rushes, 64 yards

**Top receivers**

- IND – Josh Downs – 6 receptions, 60 yards
- MIN – Justin Jefferson – 7 receptions, 137 yards

The Colts' offense failed to score a touchdown, and they dropped under .500, which they would remain for the rest of the season.

==== Week 10: vs. Buffalo Bills ====
Week 10: Buffalo Bills at Indianapolis Colts – Game summary

Quarter	1	2	3	4	Total
**Bills**	10	10	0	10	**30**
Colts	3	10	0	7	**20**

at Lucas Oil Stadium, Indianapolis, Indiana

- Date: November 10
- Game time: 1:00 p.m. EST
- Game weather: Partly sunny, 63 °F (17 °C) (retractable roof open)
- Game attendance: 66,474
- Referee: Scott Novak
- TV announcers (CBS): Andrew Catalon, Tiki Barber, Jason McCourty and AJ Ross
- Recap, Game Book

Game information

**First quarter**

- BUF – Taron Johnson 23-yard interception return (Tyler Bass kick), 12:14. Bills 7–0.
- BUF – Tyler Bass 29-yard field goal, 5:33. Bills 10–0. **Drive: 9 plays, 42 yards, 3:33.**
- IND – Matt Gay 27-yard field goal, 3:31. Bills 10–3. **Drive: 6 plays, 61 yards, 2:02.**

**Second quarter**

- IND – Tyler Goodson 2-yard pass from Joe Flacco (Matt Gay kick), 9:22. Tied 10–10. **Drive: 11 plays, 72 yards, 5:46.**
- IND – Matt Gay 23-yard field goal, 6:32. Colts 13–10. **Drive: 5 plays, 28 yards, 2:40.**
- BUF – Josh Allen 13-yard run (Tyler Bass kick), 2:14. Bills 17–13. **Drive: 8 plays, 70 yards, 4:18.**
- BUF – Tyler Bass 47-yard field goal, 0:00. Bills 20–13. **Drive: 8 plays, 60 yards, 1:10.**

**Third quarter**

- No scoring plays.

**Fourth quarter**

- BUF – Tyler Bass 28-yard field goal, 10:58. Bills 23–13. **Drive: 13 plays, 60 yards, 6:47.**
- BUF – James Cook 2-yard run (Tyler Bass kick), 3:04. Bills 30–13. **Drive: 13 plays, 84 yards, 6:42.**
- IND – Alec Pierce 10-yard pass from Joe Flacco (Matt Gay kick), 0:02. Bills 30–20. **Drive: 10 plays, 70 yards, 3:02.**

**Top passers**

- BUF – Josh Allen – 22/37, 280 yards, 2 INT
- IND – Joe Flacco – 26/35, 272 yards, 2 TD, 3 INT

**Top rushers**

- BUF – James Cook – 19 rushes, 80 yards, TD
- IND – Jonathan Taylor – 21 rushes, 114 yards

**Top receivers**

- BUF – Mack Hollins – 4 receptions, 86 yards
- IND – Alec Pierce – 4 receptions, 81 yards, TD

==== Week 11: at New York Jets ====
Week 11: Indianapolis Colts at New York Jets – Game summary

Quarter	1	2	3	4	Total
**Colts**	3	10	3	12	**28**
Jets	0	7	10	10	**27**

at MetLife Stadium, East Rutherford, New Jersey

- Date: November 17
- Game time: 1:00 p.m. EST
- Game weather: Cloudy, 62 °F (17 °C)
- Game attendance: 80,582
- Referee: Tra Blake
- TV announcers (CBS): Andrew Catalon, Tiki Barber, Jason McCourty and AJ Ross
- Recap, Game Book

Game information

**First quarter**

- IND – Matt Gay 41-yard field goal, 9:07. Colts 3–0. **Drive: 9 plays, 57 yards, 4:34.**

**Second quarter**

- IND – Anthony Richardson 2-yard run (Matt Gay kick), 14:11. Colts 10–0. **Drive: 8 plays, 66 yards, 4:27.**
- IND – Matt Gay 47-yard field goal, 6:08. Colts 13–0. **Drive: 10 plays, 10 yards, 5:58.**
- NYJ – Breece Hall 29-yard pass from Aaron Rodgers (Anders Carlson kick), 0:40. Colts 13–7. **Drive: 7 plays, 76 yards, 1:37.**

**Third quarter**

- NYJ – Breece Hall 18-yard run (Anders Carlson kick), 2:55. Jets 14–13. **Drive: 2 plays, 25 yards, 0:47.**
- IND – Matt Gay 56-yard field goal, 7:41. Colts 16–14. **Drive: 11 plays, 41 yards, 5:41.**
- NYJ – Anders Carlson 58-yard field goal, 2:55. Jets 17–16. **Drive: 4 plays, −2 yards, 1:37.**

**Fourth quarter**

- NYJ – Kenny Yeboah 11-yard pass from Aaron Rodgers (Anders Carlson kick), 13:03. Jets 24–16. **Drive: 6 plays, 59 yards, 2:54.**
- IND – Josh Downs 10-yard pass from Anthony Richardson (pass failed), 10:11. Jets 24–22. **Drive: 8 plays, 70 yards, 2:52.**
- NYJ – Anders Carlson 35-yard field goal, 2:41. Jets 27–22. **Drive: 13 plays, 53 yards, 7:30.**
- IND – Anthony Richardson 4-yard run (run failed), 0:46. Colts 28–27. **Drive: 6 plays, 70 yards, 1:55.**

**Top passers**

- IND – Anthony Richardson – 20/30, 272 yards, TD
- NYJ – Aaron Rodgers – 22/29, 184 yards, 2 TD

**Top rushers**

- IND – Jonathan Taylor – 24 rushes, 57 yards
- NYJ – Breece Hall – 16 rushes, 78 yards, TD

**Top receivers**

- IND – Josh Downs – 5 receptions, 84 yards, TD
- NYJ – Davante Adams – 6 receptions, 72 yards

==== Week 12: vs. Detroit Lions ====
Week 12: Detroit Lions at Indianapolis Colts – Game summary

Quarter	1	2	3	4	Total
**Lions**	0	14	7	3	**24**
Colts	3	3	0	0	**6**

at Lucas Oil Stadium, Indianapolis, Indiana

- Date: November 24
- Game time: 1:00 p.m. EST
- Game weather: None (retractable roof closed)
- Game attendance: 66,696
- Referee: Shawn Hochuli
- TV announcers (Fox): Kenny Albert, Jonathan Vilma and Megan Olivi
- Recap, Game Book

Game information

**First quarter**

- IND – Matt Gay 27-yard field goal, 8:53. Colts 3–0. **Drive: 11 plays, 61 yards, 6:07.**

**Second quarter**

- DET – Jahmyr Gibbs 1-yard run (Jake Bates kick), 12:07. Lions 7–3. **Drive: 9 plays, 60 yards, 4:12.**
- IND – Matt Gay 29-yard field goal, 8:16. Lions 7–6. **Drive: 9 plays, 65 yards, 3:51.**
- DET – David Montgomery 6-yard run (Jake Bates kick), 3:34. Lions 14–6. **Drive: 9 plays, 70 yards, 4:42.**

**Third quarter**

- DET – Jahmyr Gibbs 5-yard run (Jake Bates kick), 2:19. Lions 21–6. **Drive: 10 plays, 79 yards, 5:22.**

**Fourth quarter**

- DET – Jake Bates 56-yard field goal, 6:21. Lions 24–6. **Drive: 7 plays, 16 yards, 3:47.**

**Top passers**

- DET – Jared Goff – 26/36, 269 yards
- IND – Anthony Richardson – 11/28, 172 yards

**Top rushers**

- DET – Jahmyr Gibbs – 21 rushes, 90 yards, 2 TD
- IND – Anthony Richardson – 10 rushes, 61 yards

**Top receivers**

- DET – Jameson Williams – 5 receptions, 64 yards
- IND – Michael Pittman Jr. – 6 receptions, 96 yards

==== Week 13: at New England Patriots ====
Week 13: Indianapolis Colts at New England Patriots – Game summary

Quarter	1	2	3	4	Total
**Colts**	7	7	3	8	**25**
Patriots	6	10	0	8	**24**

at Gillette Stadium, Foxborough, Massachusetts

- Date: December 1
- Game time: 1:00 p.m. EST
- Game weather: Sunny, 36 °F (2 °C)
- Game attendance: 64,626
- Referee: Adrian Hill
- TV announcers (CBS): Spero Dedes, Adam Archuleta and Aditi Kinkhabwala
- Recap, Game Book

Game information

**First quarter**

- NE – Joey Slye 35-yard field goal, 9:12. Patriots 3–0. **Drive: 11 plays, 60 yards, 5:48.**
- IND – Jonathan Taylor 7-yard pass from Anthony Richardson (Matt Gay kick), 5:02. Colts 7–3. **Drive: 8 plays, 71 yards, 4:10.**
- NE – Joey Slye 31-yard field goal, 0:43. Colts 7–6. **Drive: 8 plays, 57 yards, 4:19.**

**Second quarter**

- NE – Joey Slye 54-yard field goal, 12:49. Patriots 9–7. **Drive: 4 plays, 6 yards, 2:11.**
- IND – Anthony Richardson 3-yard run (Matt Gay kick), 8:36. Colts 14–9. **Drive: 8 plays, 70 yards, 4:13.**
- NE – Austin Hooper 16-yard pass from Drake Maye (Joey Slye kick), 4:02. Patriots 16–14. **Drive: 8 plays, 70 yards, 4:34.**

**Third quarter**

- IND – Matt Gay 25-yard field goal, 7:26. Colts 17–16. **Drive: 13 plays, 68 yards, 7:34.**

**Fourth quarter**

- NE – Antonio Gibson 11-yard run (Drake Maye-Kayshon Boutte pass), 8:43. Patriots 24–17. **Drive: 9 plays, 54 yards, 5:31.**
- IND – Alec Pierce 3-yard pass from Anthony Richardson (Anthony Richardson run), 0:12. Colts 25–24. **Drive: 19 plays, 80 yards, 5:22.**

**Top passers**

- IND – Anthony Richardson – 12/24, 109 yards, 2 TD, 2 INT
- NE – Drake Maye – 24/30, 238 yards, TD, INT

**Top rushers**

- IND – Jonathan Taylor – 25 rushes, 96 yards
- NE – Rhamondre Stevenson – 18 rushes, 73 yards

**Top receivers**

- IND – Michael Pittman Jr. – 5 receptions, 42 yards
- NE – Hunter Henry – 7 receptions, 75 yards

With the win, the Colts got their first win in Foxborough since 2006 and also improved to 6–7.

==== Week 15: at Denver Broncos ====
Week 15: Indianapolis Colts at Denver Broncos – Game summary

Quarter	1	2	3	4	Total
Colts	7	6	0	0	**13**
**Broncos**	0	7	3	21	**31**

at Empower Field at Mile High, Denver, Colorado

- Date: December 15
- Game time: 4:25 p.m. EST/2:25 p.m. MST
- Game weather: Sunny, 55 °F (13 °C)
- Game attendance: 76,496
- Referee: Carl Cheffers
- TV announcers (CBS): Spero Dedes, Adam Archuleta and Aditi Kinkhabwala
- Recap, Game Book

Game information

**First quarter**

- IND – Anthony Richardson 23-yard run (Matt Gay kick), 10:52. Colts 7–0. **Drive: 10 plays, 70 yards, 4:08.**

**Second quarter**

- IND – Matt Gay 37-yard field goal, 14:49. Colts 10–0. **Drive: 14 plays, 52 yards, 7:17.**
- DEN – Adam Trautman 13-yard pass from Bo Nix (Wil Lutz kick), 5:29. Colts 10–7. **Drive: 9 plays, 54 yards, 4:31.**
- IND – Matt Gay 49-yard field goal, 0:06. Colts 13–7. **Drive: 6 plays, 15 yards, 1:32.**

**Third quarter**

- DEN – Wil Lutz 44-yard field goal, 5:18. Colts 13–10. **Drive: 4 plays, 5 yards, 1:56.**

**Fourth quarter**

- DEN – Nate Adkins 15-yard pass from Bo Nix (Wil Lutz kick), 13:51. Broncos 17–13. **Drive: 2 plays, 15 yards, 0:10.**
- DEN – Nik Bonitto 50-yard fumble return (Wil Lutz kick), 12:29. Broncos 24–13.
- DEN – Courtland Sutton 20-yard pass from Bo Nix (Wil Lutz kick), 5:48. Broncos 31–13. **Drive: 6 plays, 35 yards, 1:51.**

**Top passers**

- IND – Anthony Richardson – 17/38, 172 yards, 2 INT
- DEN – Bo Nix – 20/33, 130 yards, 3 TD, 3 INT

**Top rushers**

- IND – Jonathan Taylor – 22 rushes, 107 yards
- DEN – Bo Nix – 8 rushes, 23 yards

**Top receivers**

- IND – Michael Pittman Jr. – 6 receptions, 58 yards
- DEN – Courtland Sutton – 3 receptions, 32 yards, TD

After a decent first half in which the Colts led by six points, intercepting Bo Nix thrice, the Broncos controlled the rest of the game. The Colts had five turnovers in the second half, including Jonathan Taylor prematurely celebrating a touchdown by dropping the ball before scoring, leading to a touchback, and a failed trick play resulting in a Broncos touchdown by Nik Bonitto. The Colts allowed 24 unanswered points, and were shutout in the second half.

With the loss, the Colts fell to 6–8 and allowed the Texans, who won earlier that day, to clinch the AFC South division title. This loss left the Colts without any division titles since 2014.

==== Week 16: vs. Tennessee Titans ====
Week 16: Tennessee Titans at Indianapolis Colts – Game summary

Quarter	1	2	3	4	Total
Titans	7	0	8	15	**30**
**Colts**	0	24	14	0	**38**

at Lucas Oil Stadium, Indianapolis, Indiana

- Date: December 22
- Game time: 1:00 p.m. EST
- Game weather: None (retractable roof closed)
- Game attendance: 65,322
- Referee: John Hussey
- TV announcers (CBS): Tom McCarthy, Jay Feely, Ross Tucker and Tiffany Blackmon
- Recap, Game Book

Game information

**First quarter**

- TEN – Calvin Ridley 38-yard pass from Mason Rudolph (Brayden Narveson kick), 7:47. Titans 7–0. **Drive: 6 plays, 65 yards, 3:08.**

**Second quarter**

- IND – Anthony Richardson 5-yard run (Matt Gay kick), 11:01. Tied 7–7. **Drive: 6 plays, 57 yards, 3:10.**
- IND – Jonathan Taylor 65-yard run (Matt Gay kick), 7:25. Colts 14–7. **Drive: 4 plays, 80 yards, 2:10.**
- IND – Matt Gay 31-yard field goal, 2:09. Colts 17–7. **Drive: 8 plays, 65 yards, 4:11.**
- IND – Josh Downs 27-yard pass from Anthony Richardson (Matt Gay kick), 0:15. Colts 24–7. **Drive: 3 plays, 33 yards, 1:10.**

**Third quarter**

- IND – Jonathan Taylor 70-yard run (Matt Gay kick), 14:42. Colts 31–7. **Drive: 1 play, 70 yards, 0:18.**
- IND – Jonathan Taylor 1-yard run (Matt Gay kick), 6:50. Colts 38–7. **Drive: 4 plays, 40 yards, 1:43.**
- TEN – Tyjae Spears 11-yard run (Tony Pollard run), 2:57. Colts 38–15. **Drive: 9 plays, 70 yards, 3:53.**

**Fourth quarter**

- TEN – Nick Westbrook-Ikhine 6-yard pass from Mason Rudolph (Brayden Narveson kick), 8:13. Colts 38–22. **Drive: 6 plays, 55 yards, 2:17.**
- TEN – Tyjae Spears 2-yard run (Mason Rudolph-Chig Okonkwo pass), 2:53. Colts 38–30. **Drive: 7 plays, 71 yards, 3:05.**

**Top passers**

- TEN – Mason Rudolph – 23/34, 252 yards, 2 TD, 3 INT
- IND – Anthony Richardson – 7/11, 131 yards, TD, INT

**Top rushers**

- TEN – Tony Pollard – 8 rushes, 35 yards
- IND – Jonathan Taylor – 29 rushes, 218 yards, 3 TD

**Top receivers**

- TEN – Chig Okonkwo – 9 receptions, 81 yards
- IND – Josh Downs – 3 receptions, 61 yards, TD

The Colts scored a season high 38 points in their win, which included 24 points in the second quarter. They also rushed for a franchise single-game record 335 yards. Jonathan Taylor had a season high 218 rushing yards with 3 touchdowns, one being a 70-yard touchdown, another was a 65-yard touchdown. Anthony Richardson also added another rushing touchdown. With the win (their fourth straight over the Titans), the Colts improved to 7–8.

==== Week 17: at New York Giants ====
Week 17: Indianapolis Colts at New York Giants – Game summary

Quarter	1	2	3	4	Total
Colts	3	10	7	13	**33**
**Giants**	7	14	7	17	**45**

at MetLife Stadium, East Rutherford, New Jersey

- Date: December 29
- Game time: 1:00 p.m. EST
- Game weather: Cloudy, 54 °F (12 °C)
- Game attendance: 73,164
- Referee: Bill Vinovich
- TV announcers (Fox): Kenny Albert, Jonathan Vilma and Megan Olivi
- Recap, Game Book

Game information

**First quarter**

- IND – Matt Gay 32-yard field goal, 3:45. Colts 3–0. **Drive: 10 plays, 50 yards, 5:43.**
- NYG – Malik Nabers 31-yard pass from Drew Lock (Graham Gano kick), 1:05. Giants 7–3. **Drive: 5 plays, 70 yards, 2:40.**

**Second quarter**

- NYG – Darius Slayton 32-yard pass from Drew Lock (Graham Gano kick), 11:32. Giants 14–3. **Drive: 5 plays, 56 yards, 2:07.**
- IND – Matt Gay 29-yard field goal, 9:26. Giants 14–6. **Drive: 7 plays, 59 yards, 2:06.**
- NYG – Wan'Dale Robinson 5-yard pass from Drew Lock (Graham Gano kick), 5:55. Giants 21–6. **Drive: 7 plays, 70 yards, 3:31.**
- IND – Jonathan Taylor 3-yard run (Matt Gay kick), 0:20. Giants 21–13. **Drive: 14 plays, 70 yards, 5:35.**

**Third quarter**

- NYG – Ihmir Smith-Marsette 100-yard kickoff return (Graham Gano kick), 14:48. Giants 28–13.
- IND – Jonathan Taylor 26-yard run (Matt Gay kick), 11:03. Giants 28–20. **Drive: 7 plays, 70 yards, 3:45.**

**Fourth quarter**

- IND – Alec Pierce 13-yard pass from Joe Flacco (pass failed), 10:53. Giants 28–26. **Drive: 6 plays, 61 yards, 2:52.**
- NYG – Malik Nabers 59-yard pass from Drew Lock (Graham Gano kick), 8:39. Giants 35–26. **Drive: 4 plays, 70 yards, 2:14.**
- IND – Michael Pittman Jr. 7-yard pass from Joe Flacco (Matt Gay kick), 6:38. Giants 35–33. **Drive: 5 plays, 70 yards, 2:01.**
- NYG – Drew Lock 5-yard run (Graham Gano kick), 2:57. Giants 42–33. **Drive: 9 plays, 70 yards, 3:41.**
- NYG – Graham Gano 30-yard field goal, 2:20. Giants 45–33. **Drive: 4 plays, 5 yards, 0:26.**

**Top passers**

- IND – Joe Flacco – 26/38, 330 yards, 2 TD, 2 INT
- NYG – Drew Lock – 17/23, 309 yards, 4 TD

**Top rushers**

- IND – Jonathan Taylor – 32 rushes, 125 yards, 2 TD
- NYG – Tyrone Tracy Jr. – 20 rushes, 59 yards

**Top receivers**

- IND – Alec Pierce – 6 receptions, 122 yards, TD
- NYG – Malik Nabers – 7 receptions, 171 yards, 2 TD

With the upset loss, the Colts fell to 7–9 and became eliminated from playoff contention for the fourth straight season.

==== Week 18: vs. Jacksonville Jaguars ====
Week 18: Jacksonville Jaguars at Indianapolis Colts – Game summary

Quarter	1	2	3	4	OT	Total
Jaguars	7	6	0	10	0	**23**
**Colts**	7	13	0	3	3	**26**

at Lucas Oil Stadium, Indianapolis, Indiana

- Date: January 5
- Game time: 1:00 p.m. EST
- Game weather: None (retractable roof closed)
- Game attendance: 63,041
- Referee: Alex Kemp
- TV announcers (Fox): Jason Benetti, Brady Quinn and Sarah Kustok
- Recap, Game Book

Game information

**First quarter**

- IND – Alec Pierce 40-yard pass from Joe Flacco (Matt Gay kick), 13:50. Colts 7–0. **Drive: 3 plays, 70 yards, 1:10.**
- JAX – Tank Bigsby 1-yard run (Cam Little kick), 8:12. Tied 7–7. **Drive: 10 plays, 70 yards, 5:38.**

**Second quarter**

- JAX – Cam Little 53-yard field goal, 14:17. Jaguars 10–7. **Drive: 5 plays, 13 yards, 3:00.**
- IND – Jonathan Taylor 6-yard run (Matt Gay kick), 9:32. Colts 14–10. **Drive: 8 plays, 70 yards, 4:45.**
- IND – Matt Gay 49-yard field goal, 3:22. Colts 17–10. **Drive: 11 plays, 43 yards, 4:42.**
- JAX – Cam Little 28-yard field goal, 1:25. Colts 17–13. **Drive: 9 plays, 61 yards, 1:57.**
- IND – Matt Gay 36-yard field goal, 0:13. Colts 20–13. **Drive: 7 plays, 52 yards, 1:12.**

**Third quarter**

- No scoring plays.

**Fourth quarter**

- JAX – Parker Washington 9-yard pass from Mac Jones (Cam Little kick), 7:50. Tied 20–20. **Drive: 14 plays, 84 yards, 6:55.**
- IND – Matt Gay 45-yard field goal, 3:52. Colts 23–20. **Drive: 7 plays, 43 yards, 3:58.**
- JAX – Cam Little 53-yard field goal, 1:44. Tied 23–23. **Drive: 7 plays, 35 yards, 2:08.**

**Overtime**

- IND – Matt Gay 38-yard field goal, 5:23. Colts 26–23. **Drive: 11 plays, 50 yards, 4:37.**

**Top passers**

- JAX – Mac Jones – 20/32, 225 yards, TD, INT
- IND – Joe Flacco – 23/40, 264 yards, TD

**Top rushers**

- JAX – Tank Bigsby – 14 rushes, 39 yards, TD
- IND – Jonathan Taylor – 34 rushes, 177 yards, TD

**Top receivers**

- JAX – Brian Thomas Jr. – 7 receptions, 103 yards
- IND – Josh Downs – 10 receptions, 94 yards

With the overtime win, the Colts finished the season with a 8–9 record.

=== Standings ===
==== Division ====
AFC South
	W	L	T	PCT	DIV	CONF	PF	PA	STK
^{(4)} Houston Texans	10	7	0	.588	5–1	8–4	372	372	W1
Indianapolis Colts	8	9	0	.471	3–3	7–5	377	427	W1
Jacksonville Jaguars	4	13	0	.235	3–3	4–8	320	435	L1
Tennessee Titans	3	14	0	.176	1–5	3–9	311	460	L6

==== Conference ====
AFC
Seed	Team	Division	W	L	T	PCT	DIV	CONF	SOS	SOV	STK
**Division leaders**
1	Kansas City Chiefs	West	15	2	0	.882	5–1	10–2	.488	.463	L1
2	Buffalo Bills	East	13	4	0	.765	5–1	9–3	.467	.448	L1
3	Baltimore Ravens	North	12	5	0	.706	4–2	8–4	.529	.525	W4
4	Houston Texans	South	10	7	0	.588	5–1	8–4	.481	.376	W1
**Wild cards**
5	Los Angeles Chargers	West	11	6	0	.647	4–2	8–4	.467	.348	W3
6 (Note: Pittsburgh clinched the #6 seed over Denver based on head-to-head victory.)	Pittsburgh Steelers	North	10	7	0	.588	3–3	7–5	.502	.453	L4
7	Denver Broncos	West	10	7	0	.588	3–3	6–6	.502	.394	W1
**Did not qualify for the postseason**
8	Cincinnati Bengals	North	9	8	0	.529	3–3	6–6	.478	.314	W5
9 (Note: Indianapolis finished ahead of Miami based on head-to-head victory.)	Indianapolis Colts	South	8	9	0	.471	3–3	7–5	.457	.309	W1
10	Miami Dolphins	East	8	9	0	.471	3–3	6–6	.419	.294	L1
11	New York Jets	East	5	12	0	.294	2–4	5–7	.495	.341	W1
12 (Note: Jacksonville finished ahead of New England and Las Vegas based on conference record. (Jacksonville 4–8 to New England 3–9 to Las Vegas 3–9))	Jacksonville Jaguars	South	4	13	0	.235	3–3	4–8	.478	.265	L1
13 (Note: New England finished ahead of Las Vegas based on strength of victory. (New England .471 to Las Vegas .353))	New England Patriots	East	4	13	0	.235	2–4	3–9	.471	.471	W1
14	Las Vegas Raiders	West	4	13	0	.235	0–6	3–9	.540	.353	L1
15 (Note: Cleveland finished ahead of Tennessee based on strength of victory. (Cleveland .510 to Tennessee .431))	Cleveland Browns	North	3	14	0	.176	2–4	3–9	.536	.510	L6
16	Tennessee Titans	South	3	14	0	.176	1–5	3–9	.522	.431	L6
**Tiebreakers** (Note: When breaking ties for three or more teams under the NFL's rules, they are first broken within divisions, then comparing only the highest ranked remaining team from each division.)
