= Carlie Irsay-Gordon =

American businesswoman

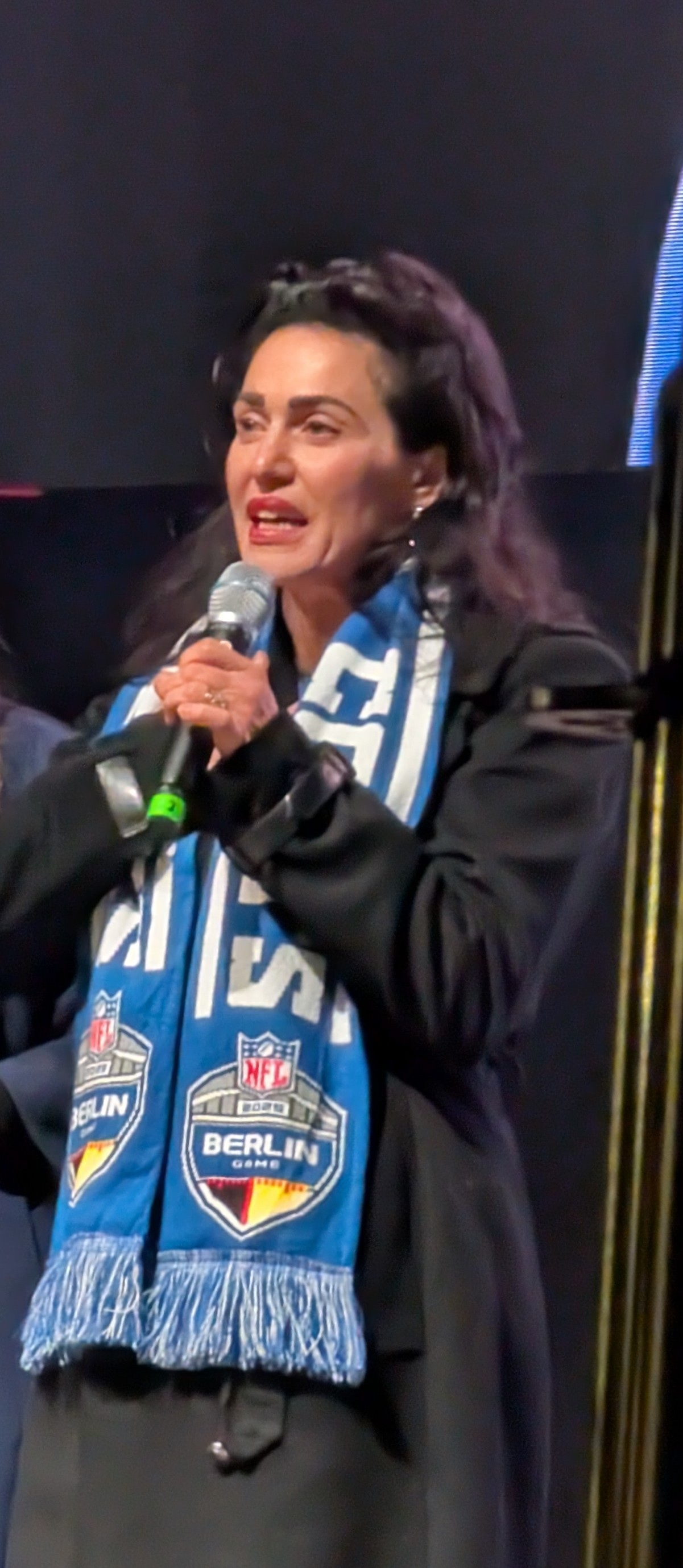
- Irsay-Gordon in 2025
- Born: Carlie Irsay; September 29, 1980 (age 46); Dallas, Texas, U.S.
- Education: Skidmore College (BA)
- Occupations: Businesswoman and sports franchise owner
- Known for: Co-owner and CEO of the Indianapolis Colts
- Spouse: Zach Gordon
- Children: 3
- Father: Jim Irsay
- Relatives: Casey Foyt (sister); Kalen Jackson (sister)

Carlie Irsay-Gordon (née Irsay; born September 29, 1980) is an American businesswoman and football executive who is the co-owner and CEO of the Indianapolis Colts of the National Football League (NFL). She is the granddaughter of Robert Irsay, the eldest daughter of Jim Irsay, and the sister of fellow Colts co-owners Casey Foyt and Kalen Jackson. Irsay-Gordon has been the principal owner and CEO of the Colts since 2025.

== Early life and education ==
Irsay-Gordon was born in Dallas, Texas, when her father was attending Southern Methodist University, but moved to Indianapolis at the age of 3.

She attended Park Tudor School and graduated in 1999. She earned her bachelor's degree from Skidmore College in 2005, where she studied religious studies and geoscience.

She rode competitively until the age of 20, on a horse named London Times.

Irsay-Gordon began coursework towards a PsyD in clinical psychology through Argosy University but did not complete her degree.

== Career ==
Irsay-Gordon first worked for the Colts in the ticket office and was subsequently involved in the marketing department and the strategies used by the sales team and ticket office.

Irsay-Gordon has represented the team at ownership meetings since 2004. She was made a team vice-president in 2008.

In March 2012, Irsay-Gordon and her sisters, Casey Foyt and Kalen Jackson, were announced as co-owners of the Colts, with the two younger sisters officially added as vice-presidents. Irsay-Gordon's father, Jim Irsay, stated that he intended the team to entirely pass to his daughters. Irsay-Gordon was then named as chair of the Colts in March 2014 shortly after Jim Irsay was arrested and entered a rehabilitation facility for drug use.

In 2016, Irsay-Gordon joined the NFL Digital Media Committee. She continued in a similar capacity into 2024 as a member of the NFL's Media Owned and Operated Committee, which oversees operations of the NFL Network and NFL.com. She is also a member of the league's Security and Fan Conduct Committee and on the board of the NFL Player Care Foundation, which provides social services to former players of the NFL.

Irsay-Gordon created and oversees the Colts' Tony Dungy Diversity Coaching Fellowship and the Harriet P. Irsay Fellowship for Women in Football programs.

Before the COVID-19 pandemic, Irsay-Gordon later recalled that she and her sister Kalen began to plan to focus the Colts' charitable attention on a single initiative, and selected a program on mental health, which became known as Kicking the Stigma. This launched in May 2021.

After her father's death in May 2025, the Colts announced that Irsay-Gordon would assume the titles of owner and CEO of the team.

During the 2025 NFL season, Irsay-Gordon was noted for her hands-on approach as CEO, wearing a headset and holding a playcalling sheet on the Colts' sidelines during games. In a press conference during which she was asked about her unorthodox ownership style, she responded, "I need to learn more about this... I need to be able to say, 'Is this person full of BS? Do they even know what they're talking about?' ... It's such a complex organism, a football team, and how it operates on game day." Some players have said she knows personal details about their lives and develops genuine relationships with staff. Linebacker Zaire Franklin noted, "There's a comfortability because we're so familiar. But, make no mistake, she's in charge."

Irsay-Gordon was named in Time's 100 Most Influential People In Sports for 2026.

== Philanthropy ==
Irsay-Gordon serves on the board of trustees of her alma mater, the Park Tudor School. Her father and two sisters, Casey Foyt and Kalen Jackson, are also Park Tudor alumni and parents. She sits on the board of the Lake Maxinkuckee Environmental Fund. She is a former board member of Visit Indy and former co-chair of Indy Championships Fund.

== Personal life ==
Irsay-Gordon lives in Indianapolis with her husband, Zach Gordon. The couple have three children.

The Indianapolis Business Journal named her to their "Forty Under 40" list in 2015.

Sporting positions
Preceded by Jim Irsay	Indianapolis Colts owner 2025–present	Incumbent
