= Kalen Jackson =

American businesswoman (born 1987)

- Born: Kalen Irsay; July 6, 1987 (age 38); Indianapolis, Indiana, U.S.
- Education: Indiana University Bloomington (BA)
- Occupations: Businesswoman and sports franchise owner
- Known for: Co-owner and chief brand officer of the Indianapolis Colts
- Spouse: Boyd Jackson
- Children: 2
- Parent: Jim Irsay

Kalen Jackson (née Irsay; born July 6, 1987) is an American businesswoman and football executive who is the co-owner and chief brand officer of the Indianapolis Colts of the National Football League (NFL) and the president of the Indianapolis Colts Foundation. She is the granddaughter of Robert Irsay, the youngest daughter of Jim Irsay, and the sister of fellow Colts co-owners Carlie Irsay-Gordon and Casey Foyt.

== Early life and education ==
Jackson was born July 6, 1987 in Indianapolis, Indiana. The youngest of Jim Irsay's three daughters, Jackson graduated from Indiana University Bloomington in 2010 with a bachelor's degree in sports management and marketing. After graduating, she began working for the Indianapolis Colts.

== Career ==
Jackson joined the Colts as a vice chair and co-owner in 2010. She coordinates the Colts' and the Irsay family's philanthropic initiatives. Most prominently, she leads Kicking the Stigma, a mental health awareness campaign. In 2025, the Colts won the Sports Humanitarian Team of the Year at the ESPY Awards for the team's work with Kicking the Stigma. Jackson facilitated the creation of the Irsay Institute at Indiana University Bloomington, a center that researches mental health and the stigma surrounding it. She has represented the Colts at NFL owners' meetings and is a chair of the NFL's employee benefits committee. With the Colts, she has also worked with the Indiana High School Athletic Association (IHSAA) to raise the profile of girls' flag football in Indiana and sanction it as an official sport for Indiana high schools. She is a board member of United Way of Central Indiana and was named a 2024 Woman of Influence by the Indianapolis Business Journal.

Jackson's ownership role with the Colts became more prominent after the death of her father and principal Colts owner, Jim Irsay, in May 2025. On June 9, 2025, the Colts announced that Jackson would assume the titles of owner and chief brand officer as well as president of the Indianapolis Colts Foundation.

== Personal life ==
Jackson and her husband, Boyd, have two daughters.
