= Casey Foyt =

American businesswoman (born 1983)

- Born: Casey Irsay; February 10, 1983 (age 43); Baltimore, Maryland, U.S.
- Education: Indiana University Bloomington (BA)
- Occupations: Businesswoman and sports franchise owner
- Known for: Co-owner and executive vice president of the Indianapolis Colts
- Spouse: A. J. Foyt IV
- Children: 5
- Parent: Jim Irsay

Casey Foyt (née Irsay; born February 10, 1983) is an American businesswoman and football executive who is the co-owner and executive vice president of the Indianapolis Colts of the National Football League (NFL). She is the granddaughter of Robert Irsay, the daughter of Jim Irsay, and the sister of fellow Colts co-owners Carlie Irsay-Gordon and Kalen Jackson.

== Early life and education ==
Foyt is the daughter of Jim Irsay and Meg Coyle. She was born in Baltimore, Maryland when her father was working for the Baltimore Colts, but moved to Indianapolis when she was one year old.

She attended Indiana University Bloomington, where she earned a bachelor's degree in sports marketing.

== Career ==
Foyt joined the Colts in 2007. The Colts announced Foyt's new position as a vice chair and co-owner in 2012. She manages the franchise's marketing and community relations and has been a major contributor to the Indianapolis Colts Women's Organization. She also represents the Colts at NFL owners' meetings. Foyt has worked in event coordination with the NFL, including in planning the league's first game outside the United States, a 2007 game in London.

Foyt's ownership role with the Colts became more prominent after the death of her father and principal Colts owner, Jim Irsay, in May 2025. On June 9, the Colts announced that Foyt would assume the titles of owner and executive vice president.

== Personal life ==
Foyt is married to A. J. Foyt IV, a former IndyCar driver who joined the Colts as a scouting assistant in 2010. The couple has five children.

Foyt was the honorary starter for the 2025 Indianapolis 500.
