= Jim Irsay =

American football executive and owner (1959–2025)

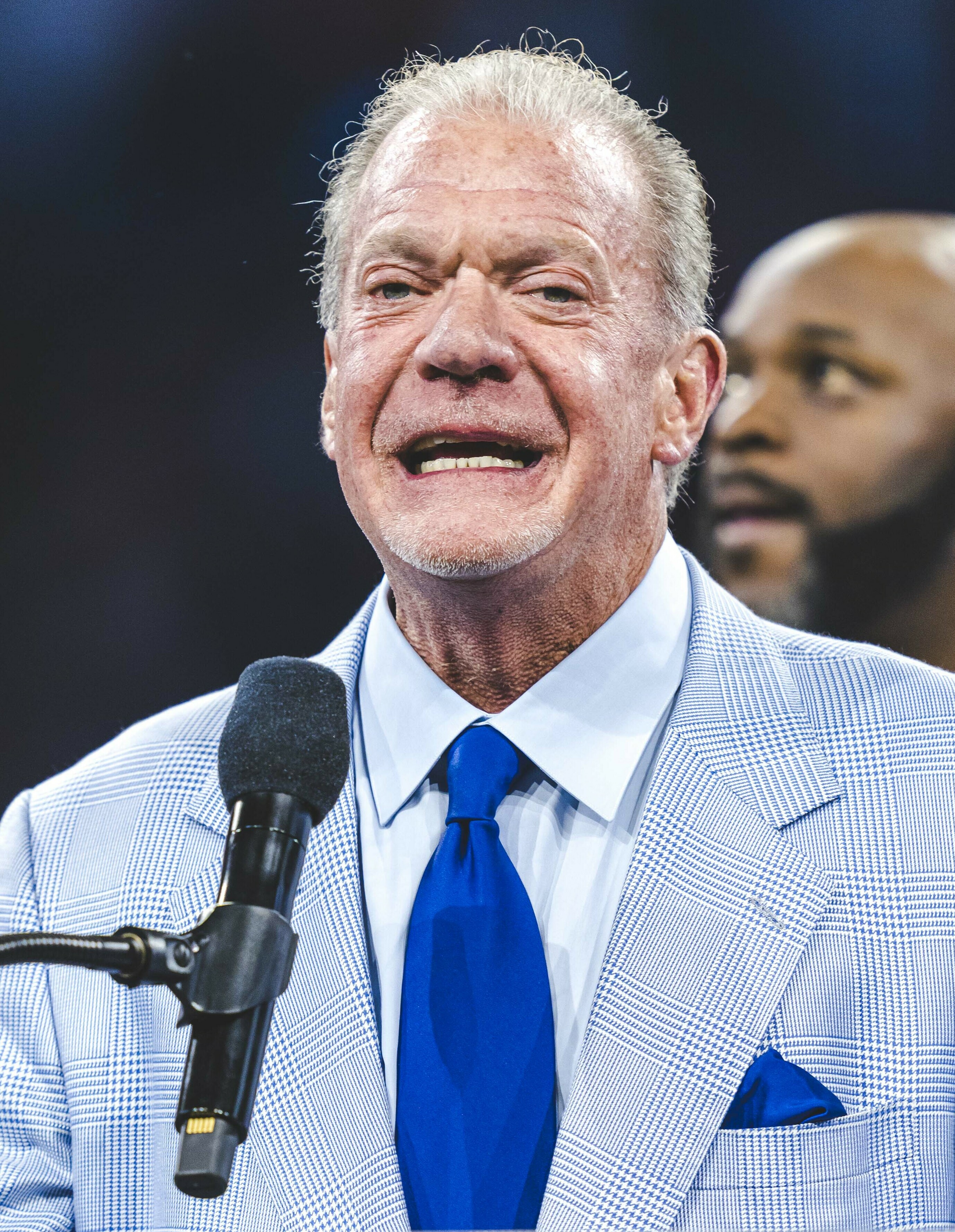
- Irsay in 2022

Personal information
- Born: June 13, 1959; Lincolnwood, Illinois, U.S.
- Died: May 21, 2025 (aged 65); Beverly Hills, California, U.S.

Career information
- High school: Loyola Academy (Wilmette, Illinois)
- College: Southern Methodist

Career history
- Indianapolis Colts (1984–1996) Vice president/general manager; Indianapolis Colts (1997–2025) Owner/chairman/CEO

Awards and highlights
- Super Bowl champion (XLI); Indianapolis Colts Ring of Honor

James Irsay (June 13, 1959 – May 21, 2025) was an American billionaire businessman who was the principal owner, chairman, and CEO of the Indianapolis Colts of the National Football League (NFL) from 1997 until his death in 2025, having previously served as general manager of the Colts from 1984 to 1996. At the time of his death, Forbes estimated his net worth at US$4.8 billion. He was the surviving child of businessman Robert Irsay (1923–1997), who acquired the Baltimore Colts in 1972 for $12 million and moved them to Indianapolis in 1984.

== Early life and education ==
Irsay was born on June 13, 1959, in Lincolnwood, Illinois, the son of Harriet (née Pogorzelski) and Chicago businessman Robert Irsay. His father was from a Hungarian Jewish family, and his mother was the daughter of Polish Catholic immigrants. Irsay was raised Catholic and did not know about his father's Jewish heritage until he was fourteen. Jim's brother, Thomas Irsay, was born with a mental disability and died in 1999, and his sister, Roberta, died in a car accident in 1971.

Irsay's father, Robert Irsay, built a fortune estimated to be over $150 million as a successful heating and air-conditioning contractor.

Irsay attended high school at Loyola Academy in Wilmette, Illinois, a suburb just north of Chicago; and at Mercersburg Academy, Mercersburg, Pennsylvania, graduating in 1978. After high school, he attended, and graduated from, Southern Methodist University in 1982 with a Bachelor of Arts degree in broadcast journalism. Irsay played linebacker for the SMU Mustangs football team as a walk-on, but an ankle injury ended his playing career.

Irsay boxed, played golf, and lifted weights during his younger years.

== Career ==
Irsay was 12 years old when his father, Robert Irsay, acquired the Baltimore Colts, after initially purchasing the Los Angeles Rams for $12 million and immediately swapping franchises with Colts owner Carroll Rosenbloom. He spent time around the team as a youth, including serving as an on-field ball boy and working in the ticket office helping to answer the phones.

After graduating from SMU in 1982, he joined the Colts' professional staff. Irsay was initially given an orientation in all facets of the administrative and football operations of the Colts before being added to the personnel department ahead of the 1983 season. His initial duties included college scouting and film analysis in addition to administrative tasks.

He was made part of the team's personnel department in 1983. He was named vice president and general manager in early 1984, immediately after the Colts relocated from Baltimore to Indianapolis. At age 24 he is the youngest person ever to have held the title of general manager in the NFL.

After his father suffered a stroke in 1995, Jim assumed day-to-day management of the club, with the modified title of "senior executive vice president, general manager and chief operating officer". When his father died in 1997, Jim engaged in a legal battle with his stepmother over ownership of the team and later became the youngest NFL team owner at 37.

According to Pro Football Reference, the 258 wins are the fourth-most in the NFL over that time frame. The team won 10 division titles, made the playoffs 18 times, appeared in 2 Super Bowls, and won Super Bowl XLI. Indianapolis won 115 regular season games from 2000 to 2009, which is the second-most in a decade by any NFL team.

Irsay reportedly was frustrated that the Colts only won a single Super Bowl title during his tenure despite having star quarterbacks in Peyton Manning and Andrew Luck. Nonetheless, Irsay released Manning who then went on to have a best late-career in signing with the Denver Broncos, and Irsay also declined to claw back the $25 million from an injury-plagued Luck who had abruptly announced his retirement after making a successful comeback.

From the time Irsay joined the organization in 1984, Irsay worked with numerous Pro Football Hall of Fame coaches, players, and executives, including Eric Dickerson (Pro Football Hall of Fame class of 1999), Marshall Faulk (2011), Bill Polian (2015), Tony Dungy (2016), Marvin Harrison (2016), Edgerrin James (2020), and Peyton Manning (2021).

In 2009, Irsay was vocal about preventing a group that included talk-show host Rush Limbaugh from purchasing the St. Louis Rams. "I, myself, couldn't even consider voting for him," Irsay said at an NFL owners meeting. "When there are comments that have been made that are inappropriate, incendiary and insensitive... our words do damage, and it's something we don't need", referring to comments Limbaugh made about Donovan McNabb in 2003, condemned as racist, when he was an NFL commentator for ESPN.

In October 2022 at a National Football League owner's meeting, Irsay said he believed "that there's merit to remove Dan Snyder as the owner of the Washington Commanders" amid calls for Snyder to sell the franchise. Irsay was the first NFL owner to publicly call for Snyder's removal as an NFL owner, reportedly even as Snyder's lawyers had dug up dirt to keep other NFL owners silent, as Irsay did not fear being embarrassed.

Irsay came under scrutiny in November 2022 when he fired Colts head coach Frank Reich after a 3–5–1 start to the season and replaced him with former Colts player Jeff Saturday as interim head coach. Saturday previously had no coaching experience beyond the high school football level, and was employed as an NFL analyst for ESPN at the time of his hiring.

== Philanthropy ==
Irsay and his family donated to various projects and programs across Indiana, including the Irsay Family YMCA, the downtown Indianapolis Colts Canal Playspace, Riley Hospital for Children, Wheeler Mission Center for Women & Children, and Indiana University's Irsay Research Institute.

On November 20, 2022, Irsay donated $1 million to the Indianapolis Zoo. The gift allowed for a renovation project and a new Indianapolis Colts Welcome Center Plaza, that was completed on Memorial Day of 2023.

In late 2020, the Irsay family launched Kicking The Stigma, which is dedicated to "raise awareness about mental health disorders and to remove the shame and stigma too often associated with these illnesses." The foundation has numerous partner organizations, including Mental Health America of Indiana, National Alliance on Mental Illness of Greater Indianapolis, Project Healthy Minds, and Bring Change to Mind. As of late 2022, Kicking The Stigma had committed more than $17 million (through action grants and personal donations by the Irsay family) towards its initiatives. In 2022, a total of $1.4 million in action grants were distributed to 23 nonprofits and organizations in the mental health sector. In 2021, the action grants totaled $2.7 million and were gifted to 16 groups.

In December 2021, the Irsay family donated $3 million to Indiana University to create a research institute dedicated to studying mental health and the stigma associated with it. The donation was an extension of Kicking The Stigma. Named the Irsay Family Research Institute, the center is located on IU's Bloomington campus in Morrison Hall. The center's foci include providing support for research, analyzing sociomedical sciences, encouraging more students to train in the mental health field, and promoting mental health both locally and nationally.

Irsay was a staunch supporter of former Colts head coach Chuck Pagano, who beat acute promyelocytic leukemia after being diagnosed in September 2012. Pagano, who was head coach of the team from 2012 to 2017, hosts his Chuckstrong Tailgate Gala every year in Indianapolis. Since 2012, the galas have raised more than $12 million for research at the Indiana University Melvin and Bren Simon Comprehensive Cancer Center, where Pagano received treatment. The gala has been hosted at the Colts' Indiana Farm Bureau Football Center as well as at Jim Irsay's house. In 2021, Irsay hosted the gala at his home and donated $2 million to the IU cancer research after Pagano made a free throw for $1 million and 10 layups for $100,000 apiece on Irsay's basketball court.

On March 30, 2023, the Miami Seaquarium announced that Lolita, the park's sole captive orca, would be returned to her natal waters in the Pacific Northwest. Irsay was involved in bankrolling the funds necessary to relocate and release Lolita and her pacific white-sided dolphin companions, Li'i and Loke. The process of moving the animals took between 18 and 24 months and cost an estimated $15–20 million, the majority of which was provided by Irsay. Lolita died on August 18, 2023, before this could be accomplished.

== Personal life ==
=== Family ===
Irsay married Meg Coyle in 1980, and the couple had three daughters, Carlie (born 1980), Casey (born 1983), and Kalen (born 1987), as well as ten grandchildren. After being separated since 2003, Meg filed for divorce on November 21, 2013.

=== Substance abuse ===
On March 16, 2014, Irsay was arrested under suspicion of driving under the influence and drug possession in Carmel, Indiana. Irsay had multiple bottles of prescription medication and more than $29,000 in cash in his car at the time of his arrest, with prosecutors claiming that Irsay tested positive for oxycodone and hydrocodone in his system. Multiple felony charges were subsequently pleaded down to a pair of misdemeanors.

Irsay's daughter, Carlie, took over the day-to-day operations of the Colts while he was in rehab. On September 2, 2014, shortly after pleading guilty to operating while intoxicated and being sentenced to one year of probation, Irsay was suspended by the NFL for six games and fined $500,000. In a 2023 interview on Real Sports, Irsay claimed he had been arrested because "I am prejudiced against because I’m a rich, white billionaire."

In a report released by TMZ in January 2024, and repeated and partially verified by other news outlets, Irsay was found unresponsive and struggling to breathe at home and was taken to the hospital on December 8, 2023. He received a dose of Narcan, a medicine that reverses an opioid overdose.

=== The Jim Irsay Collection ===
Outside football, Irsay made significant investments in music and memorabilia with The Jim Irsay Collection. In 2001, Irsay paid $2.43 million for the original manuscript of On the Road, or "the scroll": a continuous, one hundred twenty-foot scroll of tracing paper sheets that Jack Kerouac cut to size and taped together. On May 5, 2018, he purchased an original printing of the 1939 book Alcoholics Anonymous with notes handwritten by the author Bill Wilson, cofounder of AA, for $2.4 million at auction.

In 2021, Guitar Magazine characterized Irsay as the owner of "the greatest guitar collection on Earth." Irsay purchased guitars originally owned by Elvis Presley, George Harrison, John Lennon, Paul McCartney, Jerry Garcia ("Tiger"), Prince, Les Paul (his 1954 Black Beauty), and other notable performers. His purchases have set records: In 2014 he bought the electric guitar that Bob Dylan played at Newport for just under US$1 million and in 2017 he paid US$2.2 million for a Ludwig drum set belonging to Ringo Starr. On June 20, 2019, Irsay paid a record $3.975 million for a guitar, known as The Black Strat, formerly owned by Pink Floyd guitarist David Gilmour. On May 23, 2022, Irsay paid a record $4.6 million for the 1969 Fender Mustang played by Nirvana's Kurt Cobain in the music video for "Smells Like Teen Spirit".

In 2023, Irsay acquired the saddle used by Secretariat when he won the American Triple Crown in 1973. He also purchased the boots Muhammad Ali wore during his famous “Thrilla in Manila” fight against Joe Frazier, the volleyball Wilson from the movie Cast Away, and letters from Abraham Lincoln, George Washington, and Thomas Jefferson.

=== The Jim Irsay Band ===
Irsay performed with his own all-star band, The Jim Irsay Band, and hosted free concerts across the country in Nashville, Tenn., Washington, D.C., Austin, Tex., Los Angeles, New York City, Chicago, Indianapolis, San Francisco, and Las Vegas. Among the artists who performed with the band were singer-songwriter John Mellencamp, guitarist–singer Buddy Guy, singer-songwriter John Hiatt, guitarist Mike Wanchic, bassist Mike Mills, guitarist Tom Bukovac, guitarist Kenny Wayne Shepherd, drummer Kenny Aronoff, keyboardist Michael Ramos, and Rock and Roll Hall of Fame singer Ann Wilson. Pieces from The Jim Irsay Collection travel with the band and are on display.

== Death ==
On May 21, 2025, Irsay died in his sleep at The Beverly Hills Hotel in Los Angeles from cardiac arrest complicated by pneumonia at the age of 65.

On May 27, 2025, the Colts announced that they would add Jim Irsay patches to their uniforms throughout the entire season in his honor. On June 13, 2025, which would have been his 66th birthday, the Colts announced Irsay would be posthumously inducted into the Colts Ring of Honor during their 2025 season opener against the Miami Dolphins. Irsay's funeral was held on June 2, 2025, and was buried in Crown Hill Cemetery in Indianapolis shortly afterwards.

On January 23, 2026, it was announced that Irsay's death is under investigation by the FBI and the DEA after it was reported that Irsay was being treated with opioids and ketamine before his death.

Sporting positions
Preceded by Robert Irsay	Indianapolis Colts owner 1997–2025	Succeeded by Carlie Irsay-Gordon
