= 2022 Indianapolis Colts season =

70th season in franchise history

- Owner: Jim Irsay
- General manager: Chris Ballard
- Head coach: Frank Reich (fired November 7; 3–5–1 (.389) record); Jeff Saturday (interim; 1–7 (.125) record)
- Home stadium: Lucas Oil Stadium

Results
- Record: 4–12–1 (.265)
- Division place: 3rd AFC South
- Playoffs: Did not qualify
- Pro Bowlers: G Quenton Nelson

Uniform
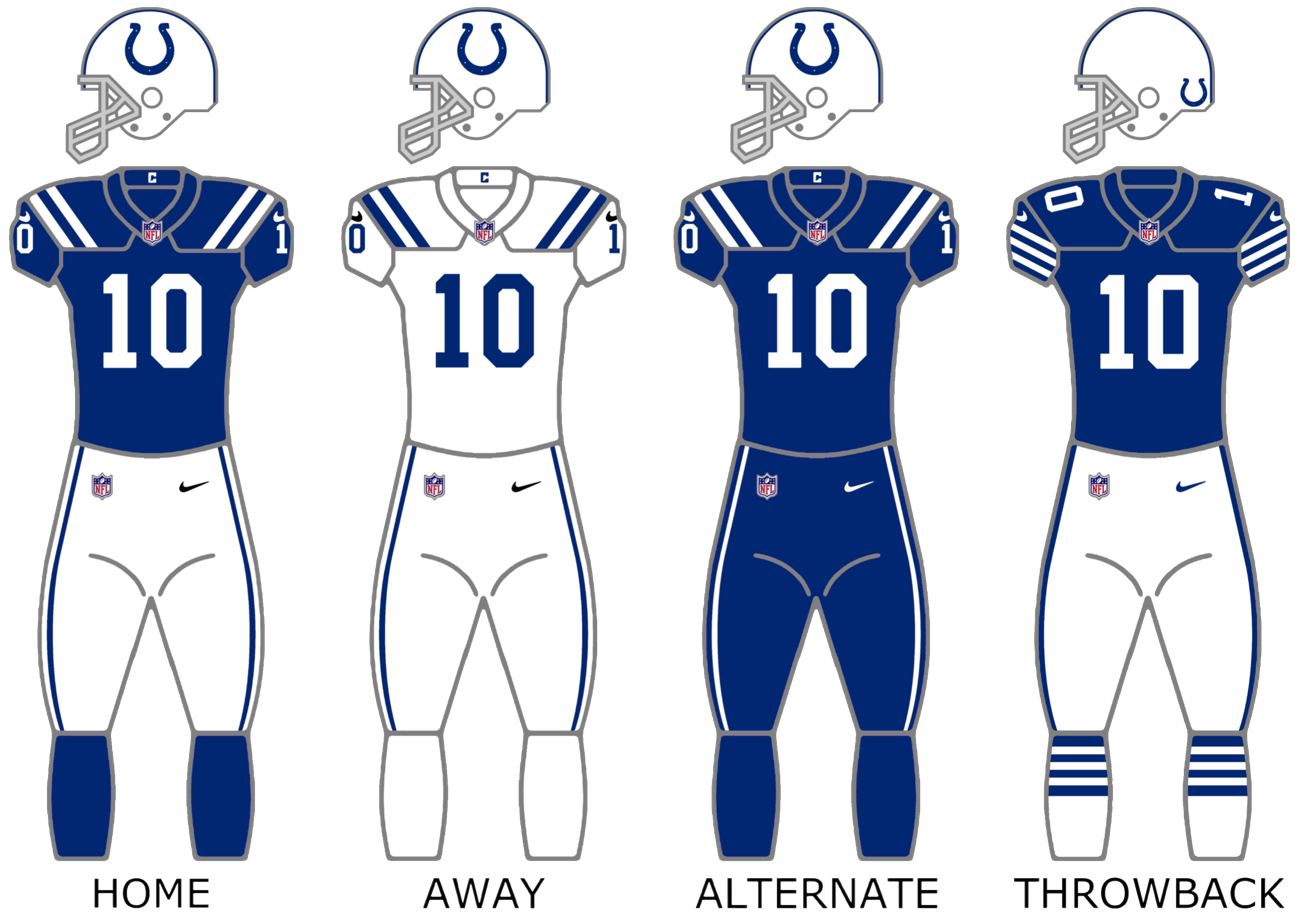

The 2022 season was the Indianapolis Colts' 70th in the National Football League (NFL), their 39th in Indianapolis, their 15th playing their home games at Lucas Oil Stadium, their sixth under the leadership of general manager Chris Ballard and their fifth and final season under head coach Frank Reich.

In the offseason, the Colts acquired former MVP quarterback Matt Ryan in exchange for a third-round pick.

After a 3–5–1 start, head coach Reich was fired from the team with former Colts offensive lineman Jeff Saturday being named the interim head coach. Saturday won his first game with the Colts against the Raiders, but did not win any more games, as the team finished the season on a 7–game losing streak. On December 17, the Colts were defeated by the Minnesota Vikings in a game that was notable for being the biggest blown lead in NFL history, as the Colts squandered a 33–0 halftime lead to lose 39–36 in overtime. This loss, coupled with the Jacksonville Jaguars win over the New York Jets the following Thursday, eliminated the Colts from playoff contention.

Despite the Colts' poor season, one highlight was a week three 20–17 upset win over the eventual Super Bowl champion Kansas City Chiefs.

== Draft ==
2022 Indianapolis Colts Draft
Round	Selection	Player	Position	College	Notes
1	16	Traded to Philadelphia (Note: The Colts traded a conditional second-round selection and a 2021 third-round selection to the Philadelphia Eagles in exchange for QB Carson Wentz. The conditional selection became a first-round selection (16th overall) because Wentz played 75% of Indianapolis' offensive snaps.)			
2	42	Traded to Minnesota (Note: The Colts traded second- and fourth-round selections (42nd and 122nd overall) to the Minnesota Vikings in exchange for second-, third-, and sixth-round selections (53rd, 77th and 192nd overall).)			from Washington (Note: The Colts traded QB Carson Wentz, and second- and seventh-round selections (47th and 240th overall) to the Washington Commanders in exchange for second- and third-round selections (42nd and 73rd overall).)
2	47	Traded to Washington			
2	53	Alec Pierce	Wide receiver	Cincinnati	from Las Vegas via Green Bay and Minnesota
3	73	Jelani Woods	Tight end	Virginia	from Washington
3	77	Bernhard Raimann	Offensive tackle	Central Michigan	from Minnesota
3	82	Traded to Atlanta (Note: The Colts traded a third-round selection (82nd overall) to the Atlanta Falcons in exchange for QB Matt Ryan.)			
3	96	Nick Cross	Safety	Maryland	from LA Rams via Denver (Note: The Colts traded a fifth-round selection (179th overall) and a 2023 third-round selection to the Denver Broncos in exchange for a third-round selection (96th overall).)
4	122	Traded to Minnesota			
5	159	Eric Johnson	Defensive tackle	Missouri State	
5	179	Traded to Denver			Compensatory selection
6	192	Drew Ogletree	Tight end	Youngstown State	from Minnesota
6	194	Traded to Philadelphia (Note: The Colts traded a sixth-round selection (194th overall) to the Philadelphia Eagles in exchange for G Matt Pryor and a seventh-round selection (240th overall).)			
6	216	Curtis Brooks	Defensive tackle	Cincinnati	Compensatory selection
7	239	Rodney Thomas II	Safety	Yale	
7	240	Traded to Washington			from Philadelphia

Draft trades

2022 Indianapolis Colts undrafted free agents
Name	Position	College	Ref.
Max Borghi	RB	Washington State	
Jack Coan	QB	Notre Dame	
Kekoa Crawford	WR	California	
Marcel Dabo	S	No college (IPPP)	
Trevor Denbow	S	SMU	
JoJo Domann	LB	Nebraska	
Ethan Fernea	WR	UCLA	
Dallis Flowers	CB	Pittsburg State	
Wesley French	C	Western Michigan	
Alex Mollette	C	Marshall	
Samson Nacua	WR	BYU	
Scott Patchan	DE	Colorado State	
D'Vonte Price	RB	FIU	
Forrest Rhyne	LB	Villanova	
Josh Seltzner	G	Wisconsin	
James Skalski	LB	Clemson	
Ryan Van Demark	OT	UConn	
CJ Verdell	RB	Oregon	
Sterling Weatherford	LB	Miami (OH)	
Cullen Wick	DE	Tulsa	
McKinley Williams III	DT	Syracuse	
Michael Young Jr.	WR	Cincinnati	

== Staff ==
2022 Indianapolis Colts staff
Front office: Owner/CEO – Jim Irsay; Vice chairwoman/co-owner – Carlie Irsay-Gordon; Vice chairwoman/co-owner – Casey Foyt; Vice chairwoman/co-owner – Kalen Jackson; General manager – Chris Ballard; Assistant general manager – Ed Dodds; Director of player personnel – Kevin Rogers Jr.; Director of football administration – Mike Bluem; Chief personnel executive – Morocco Brown; Director of pro scouting – Jon Shaw; Director of college scouting – Matt Tarpening; Assistant director of college scouting – Jamie Moore; Senior player personnel scout – Todd Vasvari; Director of player development – Brian Decker; Head coaches: Interim Head coach – Jeff Saturday; Offensive coaches: Interim offensive coordinator – Parks Frazier; Quarterbacks – Scott Milanovich; Running backs – Scottie Montgomery; Wide receivers – Reggie Wayne; Tight ends – Kevin Mawae; Offensive line – Chris Strausser; Offensive quality control/assistant to the head coach – Tyler Boyles; Offensive quality control – Brian Bratton	Defensive coaches: Defensive coordinator – Gus Bradley; Defensive line – Nate Ollie; Special defensive assistant/assistant defensive line – Matt Raich; Linebackers – Richard Smith; Assistant linebackers – Cato June; Defensive backs – Ron Milus; Assistant defensive backs – Mike Mitchell; Senior defensive assistant – John Fox; Special teams coaches: Special teams coordinator – Raymond Ventrone; Assistant special teams – Joe Hastings; Strength and conditioning: Director of sports performance – Rusty Jones; Head strength and conditioning – Richard Howell; Applied sports science/conditioning – Doug McKenney; Assistant strength and conditioning – Zane Fakes

== Final roster ==
2022 Indianapolis Colts roster
Quarterbacks (QB): 4 Sam Ehlinger; 9 Nick Foles; 2 Matt Ryan; Running backs (RB): 37 Jake Funk; 35 Deon Jackson; 21 Zack Moss; Wide receivers (WR): 1 Parris Campbell; 16 Ashton Dulin; 14 Alec Pierce; 11 Michael Pittman Jr.; 17 Mike Strachan; Tight ends (TE): 81 Mo Alie-Cox; 83 Kylen Granson; 48 Nikola Kalinic; 80 Jelani Woods	Offensive linemen (OL): 62 Wesley French C; 75 Will Fries G; 73 Dennis Kelly T; 78 Ryan Kelly C; 56 Quenton Nelson G; 63 Danny Pinter G/C; 69 Matt Pryor G/T; 79 Bernhard Raimann T; 72 Braden Smith T/G; Defensive linemen (DL): 52 Ben Banogu DE; 74 Rashod Berry DE; 99 DeForest Buckner DT; 92 Kameron Cline DE; 96 Byron Cowart DT; 93 Eric Johnson DT; 55 Khalid Kareem DE; 54 Dayo Odeyingbo DE; 51 Kwity Paye DE; 90 Grover Stewart DT; 66 Chris Williams DT	Linebackers (LB): 57 JoJo Domann MLB; 44 Zaire Franklin MLB/OLB; 59 Cameron McGrone OLB; 58 Bobby Okereke OLB; 45 E. J. Speed OLB; 41 Grant Stuard OLB; Defensive backs (DB): 39 Darrell Baker Jr. CB; 32 Julian Blackmon FS/CB; 38 Tony Brown CB; 20 Nick Cross SS; 31 Brandon Facyson CB; 33 Dallis Flowers CB; 5 Stephon Gilmore CB; 26 Rodney McLeod SS; 25 Rodney Thomas II FS; Special teams (ST): 6 Matt Haack P; 7 Chase McLaughlin K; 46 Luke Rhodes LS	Practice squad: 95 McTelvin Agim DT; 36 Henry Black FS; 15 Keke Coutee WR; 42 Marcel Dabo FS (IPP); 43 Trevor Denbow SS; 84 Ethan Fernea WR; 64 Arlington Hambright G; 71 Jordan Murray T; 50 Segun Olubi OLB; 10 Dezmon Patmon WR; 27 D'Vonte Price RB (PS/I); 40 Sheldrick Redwine FS; 47 Forrest Rhyne MLB; 3 Aaron Shampklin RB; 86 Vyncint Smith WR; 30 David Vereen CB; 49 Jalen Wydermyer TE; Reserve: 53 Shaquille Leonard MLB (IR); 94 Tyquan Lewis DE/DT (IR); 23 Kenny Moore CB (IR); 91 Yannick Ngakoue DE (IR); 61 Carter O'Donnell T (IR); 85 Drew Ogletree TE; 34 Isaiah Rodgers CB (IR); 8 Rigoberto Sanchez P (IR); 28 Jonathan Taylor RB (IR); 33 Armani Watts FS (IR); Rookies in italics 53 active, 10 reserve, 15 practice squad (2 exempt)

== Preseason ==
The Colts' preseason opponents and schedule were announced in the spring.

Week	Date	Opponent	Result	Record	Venue	Recap
1	August 13	at Buffalo Bills	L 24–27	0–1	Highmark Stadium	Recap
2	August 20	Detroit Lions	L 26–27	0–2	Lucas Oil Stadium	Recap
3	August 27	Tampa Bay Buccaneers	W 27–10	1–2	Lucas Oil Stadium	Recap

== Regular season ==
=== Schedule ===
Week	Date	Opponent	Result	Record	Venue	Recap
1	September 11	at **Houston Texans**	**T** 20–20 (OT)	0–0–1	NRG Stadium	Recap
2	September 18	at **Jacksonville Jaguars**	**L** 0–24	0–1–1	TIAA Bank Field	Recap
3	September 25	Kansas City Chiefs	**W** 20–17	1–1–1	Lucas Oil Stadium	Recap
4	October 2	**Tennessee Titans**	**L** 17–24	1–2–1	Lucas Oil Stadium	Recap
5	October 6	at Denver Broncos	**W** 12–9 (OT)	2–2–1	Empower Field at Mile High	Recap
6	October 16	**Jacksonville Jaguars**	**W** 34–27	3–2–1	Lucas Oil Stadium	Recap
7	October 23	at **Tennessee Titans**	**L** 10–19	3–3–1	Nissan Stadium	Recap
8	October 30	Washington Commanders	**L** 16–17	3–4–1	Lucas Oil Stadium	Recap
9	November 6	at New England Patriots	**L** 3–26	3–5–1	Gillette Stadium	Recap
10	November 13	at Las Vegas Raiders	**W** 25–20	4–5–1	Allegiant Stadium	Recap
11	November 20	Philadelphia Eagles	**L** 16–17	4–6–1	Lucas Oil Stadium	Recap
12	November 28	Pittsburgh Steelers	**L** 17–24	4–7–1	Lucas Oil Stadium	Recap
13	December 4	at Dallas Cowboys	**L** 19–54	4–8–1	AT&T Stadium	Recap
14	Bye					
15	December 17	at Minnesota Vikings	**L** 36–39 (OT)	4–9–1	U.S. Bank Stadium	Recap
16	December 26	Los Angeles Chargers	**L** 3–20	4–10–1	Lucas Oil Stadium	Recap
17	January 1	at New York Giants	**L** 10–38	4–11–1	MetLife Stadium	Recap
18	January 8	**Houston Texans**	**L** 31–32	4–12–1	Lucas Oil Stadium	Recap

Note: Intra-division opponents are in bold text.

=== Game summaries ===
==== Week 1: at Houston Texans ====
Week 1: Indianapolis Colts at Houston Texans – Game summary

Quarter	1	2	3	4	OT	Total
Colts	3	0	0	17	0	**20**
Texans	0	10	10	0	0	**20**

at NRG Stadium, Houston, Texas

- Date: September 11
- Game time: 1:00 p.m. EDT/12:00 p.m. CDT
- Game weather: None (retractable roof closed)
- Game attendance: 69,415
- Referee: Land Clark
- TV announcers (CBS): Tom McCarthy and Tiki Barber
- Recap, Game Book

Game information

**First quarter**

- IND – Rodrigo Blankenship 45-yard field goal, 5:13. Colts 3–0. **Drive: 12 plays, 47 yards, 6:46.**

**Second quarter**

- HOU – Kaʻimi Fairbairn 45-yard field goal, 7:50. Tied 3–3. **Drive: 14 plays, 69 yards, 6:20.**
- HOU – O. J. Howard 16-yard pass from Davis Mills (Kaʻimi Fairbairn kick), 2:37. Texans 10–3. **Drive: 4 plays, 58 yards, 1:49.**

**Third quarter**

- HOU – Kaʻimi Fairbairn 43-yard field goal, 12:17. Texans 13–3. **Drive: 5 plays, 50 yards, 2:43.**
- HOU – O. J. Howard 22-yard pass from Davis Mills (Kaʻimi Fairbairn kick), 7:16. Texans 20–3. **Drive: 4 plays, 58 yards, 1:40.**

**Fourth quarter**

- IND – Rodrigo Blankenship 27-yard field goal, 10:44. Texans 20–6. **Drive: 11 plays, 76 yards, 4:02.**
- IND – Jonathan Taylor 2-yard run (Rodrigo Blankenship kick), 7:42. Texans 20–13. **Drive: 4 plays, 20 yards, 2:07.**
- IND – Michael Pittman Jr. 15-yard pass from Matt Ryan (Rodrigo Blankenship kick), 1:54. Tied 20–20. **Drive: 7 plays, 80 yards, 2:35.**

**Overtime**

- No scoring plays

**Top passers**

- IND – Matt Ryan – 32/50, 352 yards, TD, INT
- HOU – Davis Mills – 23/37, 240 yards, 2 TD

**Top rushers**

- IND – Jonathan Taylor – 31 rushes, 161 yards, TD
- HOU – Rex Burkhead – 14 rushes, 40 yards

**Top receivers**

- IND – Michael Pittman Jr. – 9 receptions, 121 yards, TD
- HOU – Brandin Cooks – 7 receptions, 82 yards

This was the Colts first tie game since the 1982 season when they were based in Baltimore. Because the Browns won their season opener for the first time since 2004, coupled with this game, the Colts now hold the NFL's longest active season opener winless streak, not having won a season opener since 2013.

==== Week 2: at Jacksonville Jaguars ====
Week 2: Indianapolis Colts at Jacksonville Jaguars – Game summary

Quarter	1	2	3	4	Total
Colts	0	0	0	0	**0**
**Jaguars**	7	10	7	0	**24**

at TIAA Bank Field, Jacksonville, Florida

- Date: September 18
- Game time: 1:00 p.m. EDT
- Game weather: Cloudy, 78 °F (26 °C)
- Game attendance: 58,360
- Referee: Alex Kemp
- TV announcers (CBS): Tom McCarthy and Tiki Barber
- Recap, Game Book

Game information

**First quarter**

- JAX – Christian Kirk 10-yard pass from Trevor Lawrence (Riley Patterson kick), 2:21. Jaguars 7–0. **Drive: 15 plays, 68 yards, 9:11.**

**Second quarter**

- JAX – James Robinson 37-yard run (Riley Patterson kick), 7:52. Jaguars 14–0. **Drive: 6 plays, 79 yards, 3:40.**
- JAX – Riley Patterson 52-yard field goal, 1:43. Jaguars 17–0. **Drive: 10 plays, 41 yards, 4:00.**

**Third quarter**

- JAX – Christian Kirk 5-yard pass from Trevor Lawrence (Riley Patterson kick), 0:17. Jaguars 24–0. **Drive: 12 plays, 92 yards, 7:42.**

**Fourth quarter**

- No scoring plays.

**Top passers**

- IND – Matt Ryan – 16/30, 195 yards, 3 INT
- JAX – Trevor Lawrence – 25/30, 235 yards, 2 TD

**Top rushers**

- IND – Jonathan Taylor – 9 rushes, 54 yards
- JAX – James Robinson – 23 rushes, 64 yards, TD

**Top receivers**

- IND – Ashton Dulin – 5 receptions, 79 yards
- JAX – Christian Kirk – 6 receptions, 78 yards, 2 TD

The Colts failed to capitalize on offense, and were shutout for the first time since week 13 of the 2018 season, which was also against the Jaguars. This was also their eighth consecutive loss in Jacksonville.

==== Week 3: vs. Kansas City Chiefs ====
Week 3: Kansas City Chiefs at Indianapolis Colts – Game summary

Quarter	1	2	3	4	Total
Chiefs	6	8	3	0	**17**
**Colts**	7	3	3	7	**20**

at Lucas Oil Stadium, Indianapolis, Indiana

- Date: September 25
- Game time: 1:00 p.m. EDT
- Game weather: Cloudy, 65 °F (18 °C) (retractable roof open)
- Game attendance: 65,975
- Referee: Shawn Smith
- TV announcers (CBS): Jim Nantz, Tony Romo and Tracy Wolfson
- Recap, Game Book

Game information

**First quarter**

- IND – Jelani Woods 1-yard pass from Matt Ryan (Chase McLaughlin kick), 12:23. Colts 7–0. **Drive: 3 plays, 4 yards, 1:23.**
- KC – Travis Kelce 3-yard pass from Patrick Mahomes (kick failed), 0:34. Colts 7–6. **Drive: 4 plays, 35 yards, 2:03.**

**Second quarter**

- IND – Chase McLaughlin 43-yard field goal, 9:40. Colts 10–6. **Drive: 11 plays, 46 yards, 5:54.**
- KC – Clyde Edwards-Helaire 1-yard run (Patrick Mahomes-Travis Kelce pass), 1:46. Chiefs 14–10. **Drive: 5 plays, 21 yards, 1:37.**

**Third quarter**

- KC – Matt Ammendola 26-yard field goal, 7:56. Chiefs 17–10. **Drive: 15 plays, 62 yards, 7:04.**
- IND – Chase McLaughlin 51-yard field goal, 2:53. Chiefs 17–13. **Drive: 10 plays, 42 yards, 5:03.**

**Fourth quarter**

- IND – Jelani Woods 12-yard pass from Matt Ryan (Chase McLaughlin kick), 0:24. Colts 20–17. **Drive: 16 plays, 76 yards, 8:14.**

**Top passers**

- KC – Patrick Mahomes – 20/35, 262 yards, TD, INT
- IND – Matt Ryan – 27/37, 222 yards, 2 TD

**Top rushers**

- KC – Patrick Mahomes – 4 rushes, 26 yards
- IND – Jonathan Taylor – 21 rushes, 71 yards

**Top receivers**

- KC – JuJu Smith-Schuster – 5 receptions, 89 yards
- IND – Michael Pittman Jr. – 8 receptions, 72 yards

==== Week 4: vs. Tennessee Titans ====
Week 4: Tennessee Titans at Indianapolis Colts – Game summary

Quarter	1	2	3	4	Total
**Titans**	14	10	0	0	**24**
Colts	0	10	7	0	**17**

at Lucas Oil Stadium, Indianapolis, Indiana

- Date: October 2
- Game time: 1:00 p.m. EDT
- Game weather: Sunny, 63 °F (17 °C) (retractable roof open)
- Game attendance: 65,781
- Referee: Scott Novak
- TV announcers (Fox): Adam Amin, Mark Schlereth and Kristina Pink
- Recap, Game Book

Game information

**First quarter**

- TEN – Robert Woods 7-yard pass from Ryan Tannehill (Randy Bullock kick), 8:00. Titans 7–0. **Drive: 5 plays, 32 yards, 2:47.**
- TEN – Derrick Henry 19-yard run (Randy Bullock kick), 3:46. Titans 14–0. **Drive: 6 plays, 75 yards, 3:19.**

**Second quarter**

- IND – Chase McLaughlin 27-yard field goal, 13:25. Titans 14–3. **Drive: 11 plays, 66 yards, 5:21.**
- TEN – Randy Bullock 44-yard field goal, 9:39. Titans 17–3. **Drive: 9 plays, 41 yards, 3:46.**
- TEN – Chig Okonkwo 8-yard pass from Ryan Tannehill (Randy Bullock kick), 7:40. Titans 24–3. **Drive: 5 plays, 28 yards, 1:54.**
- IND – Mo Alie-Cox 14-yard pass from Matt Ryan (Chase McLaughlin kick), 2:13. Titans 24–10. **Drive: 9 plays, 75 yards, 5:27.**

**Third quarter**

- IND – Mo Alie-Cox 7-yard pass from Matt Ryan (Chase McLaughlin kick), 7:26. Titans 24–17. **Drive: 8 plays, 67 yards, 5:09.**

**Fourth quarter**

- No scoring plays.

**Top passers**

- TEN – Ryan Tannehill – 17/21, 137 yards, 2 TD
- IND – Matt Ryan – 27/37, 356 yards, 2 TD, INT

**Top rushers**

- TEN – Derrick Henry – 22 rushes, 114 yards, TD
- IND – Jonathan Taylor – 20 rushes, 42 yards

**Top receivers**

- TEN – Robert Woods – 4 receptions, 30 yards, TD
- IND – Mo Alie-Cox – 6 receptions, 85 yards, 2 TD

==== Week 5: at Denver Broncos ====
Week 5: Indianapolis Colts at Denver Broncos – Game summary

Quarter	1	2	3	4	OT	Total
**Colts**	0	3	3	3	3	**12**
Broncos	3	3	3	0	0	**9**

at Empower Field at Mile High, Denver, Colorado

- Date: October 6
- Game time: 8:15 p.m. EDT/6:15 p.m. MDT
- Game weather: Partly cloudy, 69 °F (21 °C)
- Game attendance: 76,667
- Referee: Brad Rogers
- TV announcers (WRTV/Prime Video): Al Michaels, Kirk Herbstreit and Kaylee Hartung
- Recap, Game Book

Game information

**First quarter**

- DEN – Brandon McManus 33-yard field goal, 9:28. Broncos 3–0. **Drive: 10 plays, 49 yards, 4:09.**

**Second quarter**

- DEN – Brandon McManus 44-yard field goal, 10:58. Broncos 6–0. **Drive: 10 plays, 40 yards, 4:14.**
- IND – Chase McLaughlin 52-yard field goal, 0:12. Broncos 6–3. **Drive: 14 plays, 52 yards, 3:36.**

**Third quarter**

- IND – Chase McLaughlin 51-yard field goal, 8:51. Tied 6–6. **Drive: 9 plays, 34 yards, 3:57.**
- DEN – Brandon McManus 45-yard field goal, 3:19. Broncos 9–6. **Drive: 4 plays, 0 yards, 0:19.**

**Fourth quarter**

- IND – Chase McLaughlin 31-yard field goal, 0:05. Tied 9–9. **Drive: 10 plays, 67 yards, 2:08.**

**Overtime**

- IND – Chase McLaughlin 48-yard field goal, 5:50. Colts 12–9. **Drive: 8 plays, 45 yards, 4:10.**

**Top passers**

- IND – Matt Ryan – 26/41, 251 yards, INT
- DEN – Russell Wilson – 21/39, 274 yards, 2 INT

**Top rushers**

- IND – Deon Jackson – 13 rushes, 62 yards
- DEN – Melvin Gordon – 15 rushes, 54 yards

**Top receivers**

- IND – Alec Pierce – 8 receptions, 81 yards
- DEN – Courtland Sutton – 5 receptions, 74 yards

Neither side scored a touchdown as Russell Wilson and Matt Ryan struggled throughout the game. Stephon Gilmore helped win with an interception in the endzone and a mishap by Russell Wilson that he threw to Courtland Sutton while he was covered by Gilmore and ended up being incomplete on 4th down, missing a wide open K. J. Hamler. With the win, the Colts improved to 2–2–1.

==== Week 6: vs. Jacksonville Jaguars ====
Week 6: Jacksonville Jaguars at Indianapolis Colts – Game summary

Quarter	1	2	3	4	Total
Jaguars	7	7	7	6	**27**
**Colts**	0	13	6	15	**34**

at Lucas Oil Stadium, Indianapolis, Indiana

- Date: October 16
- Game time: 1:00 p.m. EDT
- Game weather: Sunny, 62 °F (17 °C) (retractable roof open)
- Game attendance: 65,749
- Referee: Jerome Boger
- TV announcers (CBS): Andrew Catalon, James Lofton and Amanda Renner
- Recap, Game Book

Game information

**First quarter**

- JAX – Trevor Lawrence 1-yard run (Riley Patterson kick), 3:48. Jaguars 7–0. **Drive: 6 plays, 56 yards, 3:30.**

**Second quarter**

- IND – Chase McLaughlin 28-yard field goal, 13:56. Jaguars 7–3. **Drive: 13 plays, 67 yards, 4:52.**
- JAX – JaMycal Hasty 61-yard run (Riley Patterson kick), 11:27. Jaguars 14–3. **Drive: 4 plays, 75 yards, 2:29.**
- IND – Parris Campbell 4-yard pass from Matt Ryan (Chase McLaughlin kick), 2:06. Jaguars 14–10. **Drive: 8 plays, 54 yards, 4:28.**
- IND – Chase McLaughlin 42-yard field goal, 0:21. Jaguars 14–13. **Drive: 9 plays, 37 yards, 1:10.**

**Third quarter**

- JAX – Trevor Lawrence 2-yard run (Riley Patterson kick), 10:55. Jaguars 21–13. **Drive: 7 plays, 75 yards, 4:05.**
- IND – Deon Jackson 3-yard run (pass failed), 5:44. Jaguars 21–19. **Drive: 10 plays, 75 yards, 5:11.**

**Fourth quarter**

- IND – Jelani Woods 10-yard pass from Matt Ryan (Chase McLaughlin kick), 12:47. Colts 26–21. **Drive: 9 plays, 66 yards, 3:22.**
- JAX – Christian Kirk 4-yard pass from Trevor Lawrence (pass failed), 2:44. Jaguars 27–26. **Drive: 18 plays, 84 yards, 10:03**
- IND – Alec Pierce 32-yard pass from Matt Ryan (Phillip Lindsay run), 0:17. Colts 34–27. **Drive: 11 plays, 66 yards, 2:27.**

**Top passers**

- JAX – Trevor Lawrence – 20/22, 165 yards, TD
- IND – Matt Ryan – 42/58, 389 yards, 3 TD

**Top rushers**

- JAX – Travis Etienne – 10 rushes, 86 yards
- IND – Deon Jackson – 12 rushes, 42 yards

**Top receivers**

- JAX – Zay Jones – 5 receptions, 42 yards
- IND – Michael Pittman Jr. – 13 receptions, 134 yards

==== Week 7: at Tennessee Titans ====
Week 7: Indianapolis Colts at Tennessee Titans – Game summary

Quarter	1	2	3	4	Total
Colts	0	0	7	3	**10**
**Titans**	3	10	0	6	**19**

at Nissan Stadium, Nashville, Tennessee

- Date: October 23
- Game time: 1:00 p.m. EDT/12:00 p.m. CDT
- Game weather: Sunny, 74 °F (23 °C)
- Game attendance: 69,459
- Referee: Ronald Torbert
- TV announcers (CBS): Andrew Catalon, James Lofton and Don Bell
- Recap, Game Book

Game information

**First quarter**

- TEN – Randy Bullock 27-yard field goal, 4:03. Titans 3–0. **Drive: 11 plays, 62 yards, 5:32.**

**Second quarter**

- TEN – Andrew Adams 76-yard interception return (Randy Bullock kick), 9:25. Titans 10–0.
- TEN – Randy Bullock 28-yard field goal, 1:57. Titans 13–0. **Drive: 8 plays, 52 yards, 3:44.**

**Third quarter**

- IND – Parris Campbell 4-yard pass from Matt Ryan (Chase McLaughlin kick), 4:07. Titans 13–7. **Drive: 12 plays, 58 yards, 6:20.**

**Fourth quarter**

- TEN – Randy Bullock 38-yard field goal, 13:47. Titans 16–7. **Drive: 11 plays, 55 yards, 5:20.**
- IND – Chase McLaughlin 50-yard field goal, 8:31. Titans 16–10. **Drive: 6 plays, 24 yards, 2:35.**
- TEN – Randy Bullock 48-yard field goal, 4:47. Titans 19–10. **Drive: 9 plays, 41 yards, 3:44.**

**Top passers**

- IND – Matt Ryan – 33/44, 243 yards, TD, 2 INT
- TEN – Ryan Tannehill – 13/20, 132 yards

**Top rushers**

- IND – Jonathan Taylor – 10 rushes, 58 yards
- TEN – Derrick Henry – 30 rushes, 128 yards

**Top receivers**

- IND – Parris Campbell – 10 receptions, 70 yards, TD
- TEN – Austin Hooper – 3 receptions, 56 yards

==== Week 8: vs. Washington Commanders ====
Week 8: Washington Commanders at Indianapolis Colts – Game summary

Quarter	1	2	3	4	Total
**Commanders**	0	7	0	10	**17**
Colts	0	3	3	10	**16**

at Lucas Oil Stadium, Indianapolis, Indiana

- Date: October 30
- Game time: 4:25 p.m. EDT
- Game weather: None (retractable roof closed)
- Game attendance: 65,515
- Referee: Craig Wrolstad
- TV announcers (Fox): Brandon Gaudin, Robert Smith and Jen Hale
- Recap, Game Book

Game information

**First quarter**

- No scoring plays.

**Second quarter**

- IND – Chase McLaughlin 46-yard field goal, 14:13. Colts 3–0. **Drive: 11 plays, 64 yards, 6:04.**
- WAS – Antonio Gibson 9-yard pass from Taylor Heinicke (Joey Slye kick), 10:55. Commanders 7–3. **Drive: 6 plays, 75 yards, 3:18.**

**Third quarter**

- IND – Chase McLaughlin 39-yard field goal, 7:13. Commanders 7–6. **Drive: 10 plays, 29 yards, 4:58.**

**Fourth quarter**

- IND – Chase McLaughlin 20-yard field goal, 12:32. Colts 9–7. **Drive: 7 plays, 60 yards, 3:40.**
- IND – Nyheim Hines 6-yard run (Chase McLaughlin kick), 11:12. Colts 16–7. **Drive: 2 plays, 24 yards, 1:11.**
- WAS – Joey Slye 28-yard field goal, 4:55. Colts 16–10. **Drive: 12 plays, 82 yards, 6:17.**
- WAS – Taylor Heinicke 1-yard run (Joey Slye kick), 0:22. Commanders 17–16. **Drive: 9 plays, 89 yards, 2:17.**

**Top passers**

- WAS – Taylor Heinicke – 23/31, 279 yards, INT
- IND – Sam Ehlinger – 17/23, 207 yards

**Top rushers**

- WAS – Taylor Heinicke – 6 rushes, 29 yards, TD
- IND – Jonathan Taylor – 16 rushes, 76 yards

**Top receivers**

- WAS – Terry McLaurin – 6 receptions, 113 yards
- IND – Alec Pierce – 3 receptions, 65 yards

==== Week 9: at New England Patriots ====
Week 9: Indianapolis Colts at New England Patriots – Game summary

Quarter	1	2	3	4	Total
Colts	0	0	3	0	**3**
**Patriots**	0	13	3	10	**26**

at Gillette Stadium, Foxborough, Massachusetts

- Date: November 6
- Game time: 1:00 p.m. EST
- Game weather: Mostly cloudy, 75 °F (24 °C)
- Game attendance: 65,878
- Referee: Clay Martin
- TV announcers (CBS): Greg Gumbel, Adam Archuleta and AJ Ross
- Recap, Game Book

Game information

**First quarter**

- No scoring plays.

**Second quarter**

- NE – Nick Folk 49-yard field goal, 13:30. Patriots 3–0. **Drive: 6 plays, 42 yards, 2:46.**
- NE – Nick Folk 43-yard field goal, 8:50. Patriots 6–0. **Drive: 7 plays, 19 yards, 3:00.**
- NE – Rhamondre Stevenson 3-yard pass from Mac Jones (Nick Folk kick), 6:12. Patriots 13–0. **Drive: 2 plays, 2 yards, 0:46.**

**Third quarter**

- IND – Chase McLaughlin 40-yard field goal, 8:00. Patiots 13–3. **Drive: 8 plays, 18 yards, 4:40.**
- NE – Nick Folk 43-yard field goal, 4:17. Patriots 16–3. **Drive: 9 plays, 42 yards, 3:43.**

**Fourth quarter**

- NE – Nick Folk 28-yard field goal, 10:10. Patriots 19–3. **Drive: 10 plays, 35 yards, 4:45.**
- NE – Jonathan Jones 17-yard interception return (Nick Folk kick), 3:59. Patriots 26–3.

**Top passers**

- IND – Sam Ehlinger – 15/29, 103 yards, INT
- NE – Mac Jones – 20/30, 147 yards, TD

**Top rushers**

- IND – Sam Ehlinger – 5 rushes, 39 yards
- NE – Rhamondre Stevenson – 15 rushes, 60 yards

**Top receivers**

- IND – Jordan Wilkins – 4 receptions, 15 yards
- NE – Hunter Henry – 5 receptions, 50 yards

After the game, head coach Frank Reich was fired after a 3-5-1 start, and was replaced by former Colts center Jeff Saturday, who had no coaching experience above the high school level.

==== Week 10: at Las Vegas Raiders ====
Week 10: Indianapolis Colts at Las Vegas Raiders – Game summary

Quarter	1	2	3	4	Total
**Colts**	7	6	6	6	**25**
Raiders	0	7	7	6	**20**

at Allegiant Stadium, Paradise, Nevada

- Date: November 13
- Game time: 4:05 p.m. EST/1:05 p.m. PST
- Game weather: None (indoor stadium)
- Game attendance: 62,197
- Referee: Tra Blake
- TV announcers (CBS): Kevin Harlan, Trent Green and Melanie Collins
- Recap, Game Book

Game information

**First quarter**

- IND – Matt Ryan 1-yard run (Chase McLaughlin kick), 3:17. Colts 7–0. **Drive: 11 plays, 70 yards, 6:34.**

**Second quarter**

- IND – Chase McLaughlin 48-yard field goal, 12:38. Colts 10–0. **Drive: 10 plays, 50 yards, 4:46.**
- LV – Foster Moreau 4-yard pass from Derek Carr (Daniel Carlson kick), 0:58. Colts 10–7. **Drive: 12 plays, 79 yards, 5:40.**
- IND – Chase McLaughlin 48-yard field goal, 0:00. Colts 13–7. **Drive: 7 plays, 45 yards, 0:58.**

**Third quarter**

- LV – Josh Jacobs 1-yard run (Daniel Carlson kick), 1:51. Raiders 14–13. **Drive: 11 plays, 70 yards, 6:34.**
- IND – Jonathan Taylor 66-yard run (pass failed), 1:01. Colts 19–14. **Drive: 2 plays, 70 yards, 0:50.**

**Fourth quarter**

- LV – Davante Adams 48-yard pass from Derek Carr (pass failed), 11:36. Raiders 20–19. **Drive: 3 plays, 48 yards, 0:56.**
- IND – Parris Campbell 35-yard pass from Matt Ryan (pass failed), 5:07. Colts 25–20. **Drive: 5 plays, 82 yards, 2:53.**

**Top passers**

- IND – Matt Ryan – 21/28, 222 yards, TD
- LV – Derek Carr – 24/38, 248 yards, 2 TD

**Top rushers**

- IND – Jonathan Taylor – 22 rushes, 147 yards, TD
- LV – Josh Jacobs – 21 rushes, 78 yards, TD

**Top receivers**

- IND – Parris Campbell – 7 receptions, 76 yards, TD
- LV – Davante Adams – 9 receptions, 126 yards, TD

==== Week 11: vs. Philadelphia Eagles ====
Week 11: Philadelphia Eagles at Indianapolis Colts – Game summary

Quarter	1	2	3	4	Total
**Eagles**	0	3	0	14	**17**
Colts	7	3	3	3	**16**

at Lucas Oil Stadium, Indianapolis, Indiana

- Date: November 20
- Game time: 1:00 p.m. EST
- Game weather: None (retractable roof closed)
- Game attendance: 66,241
- Referee: Land Clark
- TV announcers (CBS): Ian Eagle, Charles Davis and Evan Washburn
- Recap, Game Book

Game information

**First quarter**

- IND – Jonathan Taylor 1-yard run (Chase McLaughlin kick), 9:37. Colts 7–0. **Drive: 10 plays, 75 yards, 5:23.**

**Second quarter**

- PHI – Jake Elliott 22-yard field goal, 4:50. Colts 7–3. **Drive: 15 plays, 54 yards, 7:08.**
- IND – Chase McLaughlin 51-yard field goal, 0:13. Colts 10–3. **Drive: 5 plays, 22 yards, 1:30.**

**Third quarter**

- IND – Chase McLaughlin 36-yard field goal, 13:14. Colts 13–3. **Drive: 4 plays, 5 yards, 1:35.**

**Fourth quarter**

- PHI – Quez Watkins 22-yard pass from Jalen Hurts (Jake Elliott kick), 13:31. Colts 13–10. **Drive: 5 plays, 60 yards, 2:04.**
- IND – Chase McLaughlin 37-yard field goal, 4:37. Colts 16–10. **Drive: 11 plays, 47 yards, 4:57.**
- PHI – Jalen Hurts 1-yard run (Jake Elliott kick), 1:20. Eagles 17–16. **Drive: 11 plays, 75 yards, 3:17.**

**Top passers**

- PHI – Jalen Hurts – 18/25, 190 yards, TD
- IND – Matt Ryan – 23/32, 213 yards

**Top rushers**

- PHI – Jalen Hurts – 16 rushes, 86 yards, TD
- IND – Jonathan Taylor – 22 rushes, 84 yards, TD

**Top receivers**

- PHI – DeVonta Smith – 6 receptions, 78 yards
- IND – Michael Pittman Jr. – 6 receptions, 75 yards

==== Week 12: vs. Pittsburgh Steelers ====
Week 12: Pittsburgh Steelers at Indianapolis Colts – Game summary

Quarter	1	2	3	4	Total
**Steelers**	3	13	0	8	**24**
Colts	0	3	14	0	**17**

at Lucas Oil Stadium, Indianapolis, Indiana

- Date: November 28
- Game time: 8:15 p.m. EST
- Game weather: None (retractable roof closed)
- Game attendance: 65,982
- Referee: Bill Vinovich
- TV announcers (WISH-TV/ESPN): Joe Buck, Troy Aikman and Lisa Salters
- Recap, Game Book

Game information

**First quarter**

- PIT – Matthew Wright 45-yard field goal, 9:27. Steelers 3–0. **Drive: 10 plays, 48 yards, 5:33.**

**Second quarter**

- PIT – Matthew Wright 52-yard field goal, 14:09. Steelers 6–0. **Drive: 8 plays, 27 yards, 3:51.**
- PIT – Najee Harris 6-yard run (Matthew Wright kick), 7:46. Steelers 13–0. **Drive: 10 plays, 79 yards, 5:31.**
- IND – Chase McLaughlin 51-yard field goal, 3:48. Steelers 13–3. **Drive: 10 plays, 42 yards, 3:58.**
- PIT – Matthew Wright 25-yard field goal, 0:56. Steelers 16–3. **Drive: 12 plays, 68 yards, 2:52.**

**Third quarter**

- IND – Jonathan Taylor 2-yard run (Chase McLaughlin kick), 13:04. Steelers 16–10. **Drive: 4 plays, 9 yards, 1:56.**
- IND – Michael Pittman Jr. 6-yard pass from Matt Ryan (Chase McLaughlin kick), 0:16. Colts 17–16. **Drive: 6 plays, 55 yards, 2:41.**

**Fourth quarter**

- PIT – Benny Snell 2-yard run (Kenny Pickett-George Pickens pass), 9:55. Steelers 24–17. **Drive: 11 plays, 75 yards, 5:21.**

**Top passers**

- PIT – Kenny Pickett – 20/28, 174 yards
- IND – Matt Ryan – 22/34, 199 yards, TD, INT

**Top rushers**

- PIT – Benny Snell – 12 rushes, 62 yards, TD
- IND – Jonathan Taylor – 20 rushes, 86 yards, TD

**Top receivers**

- PIT – George Pickens – 3 receptions, 57 yards
- IND – Jelani Woods – 8 receptions, 98 yards

==== Week 13: at Dallas Cowboys ====
Week 13: Indianapolis Colts at Dallas Cowboys – Game summary

Quarter	1	2	3	4	Total
Colts	10	3	6	0	**19**
**Cowboys**	7	14	0	33	**54**

at AT&T Stadium, Arlington, Texas

- Date: December 4
- Game time: 8:20 p.m. EST/7:20 p.m. CST
- Game weather: None (retractable roof closed)
- Game attendance: 93,086
- Referee: Carl Cheffers
- TV announcers (NBC): Mike Tirico, Cris Collinsworth and Melissa Stark
- Recap, Game Book

Game information

**First quarter**

- IND – Chase McLaughlin 52-yard field goal, 10:49. Colts 3–0. **Drive: 6 plays, 20 yard, 2:42.**
- DAL – CeeDee Lamb 20-yard pass from Dak Prescott (Brett Maher kick), 4:50. Cowboys 7–3. **Drive: 12 plays, 73 yards, 5:59.**
- IND – Ashton Dulin 14-yard pass from Matt Ryan (Chase McLaughlin kick), 2:37. Colts 10–7. **Drive: 5 plays, 79 yard, 2:13.**

**Second quarter**

- DAL – Tony Pollard 2-yard run (Brett Maher kick), 10:16. Cowboys 14–10. **Drive: 6 plays, 56 yards, 2:58.**
- IND – Chase McLaughlin 34-yard field goal, 1:47. Cowboys 14–13. **Drive: 4 plays, 3 yard, 0:57.**
- DAL – Michael Gallup 13-yard pass from Dak Prescott (Brett Maher kick), 0:13. Cowboys 21–13. **Drive: 5 plays, 26 yards, 0:42.**

**Third quarter**

- IND – Alec Pierce 15-yard pass from Matt Ryan (pass failed), 3:43. Cowboys 21–19. **Drive: 15 plays, 90 yards, 8:00.**

**Fourth quarter**

- DAL – Michael Gallup 3-yard pass from Dak Prescott (Brett Maher kick), 13:52. Cowboys 28–19. **Drive: 10 plays, 75 yards, 4:51.**
- DAL – Malik Hooker 38-yard fumble return (pass failed), 13:34. Cowboys 34–19.
- DAL – Tony Pollard 30-yard run (kick blocked), 9:46. Cowboys 40–19. **Drive: 3 plays, 53 yards, 1:17.**
- DAL – Ezekiel Elliott 4-yard run (Brett Maher kick), 6:06. Cowboys 47–19. **Drive: 5 plays, 72 yards, 2:58.**
- DAL – Malik Davis 4-yard run (Brett Maher kick), 2:25. Cowboys 54–19. **Drive: 3 plays, 29 yards, 1:34.**

**Top passers**

- IND – Matt Ryan – 21/37, 233 yards, 2 TD, 3 INT
- DAL – Dak Prescott – 20/30, 170 yards, 3 TD, INT

**Top rushers**

- IND – Jonathan Taylor – 21 rushes, 82 yards
- DAL – Tony Pollard – 12 rushes, 91 yards, 2 TD

**Top receivers**

- IND – Alec Pierce – 4 receptions, 86 yards, TD
- DAL – CeeDee Lamb – 5 receptions, 71 yards, TD

==== Week 15: at Minnesota Vikings ====
Week 15: Indianapolis Colts at Minnesota Vikings – Game summary

Quarter	1	2	3	4	OT	Total
Colts	17	16	3	0	0	**36**
**Vikings**	0	0	14	22	3	**39**

at U.S. Bank Stadium, Minneapolis, Minnesota

- Date: December 17
- Game time: 1:00 p.m. EST/12:00 p.m. CST
- Game weather: None (indoor stadium)
- Game attendance: 66,801
- Referee: Tra Blake
- TV announcers (NFLN): Noah Eagle, Nate Burleson, Tom Pelissero and Lindsay Czarniak
- Recap, Game Book

Game information

**First quarter**

- IND – Chase McLaughlin 26-yard field goal, 9:11. Colts 3–0. **Drive: 11 plays, 44 yards, 5:49.**
- IND – JoJo Domann 24-yard return of blocked punt (Chase McLaughlin kick), 8:12. Colts 10–0.
- IND – Deon Jackson 1-yard pass from Matt Ryan (Chase McLaughlin kick), 3:51. Colts 17–0. **Drive: 7 plays, 66 yards, 3:29.**

**Second quarter**

- IND – Chase McLaughlin 28-yard field goal, 13:07. Colts 20–0. **Drive: 6 plays, 21 yards, 3:03.**
- IND – Chase McLaughlin 49-yard field goal, 10:41. Colts 23–0. **Drive: 4 plays, 0 yards, 0:20.**
- IND – Julian Blackmon 17-yard interception return (Chase McLaughlin kick), 5:50. Colts 30–0.
- IND – Chase McLaughlin 27-yard field goal, 0:08. Colts 33–0. **Drive: 9 plays, 65 yards, 3:52.**

**Third quarter**

- MIN – K. J. Osborn 2-yard pass from Kirk Cousins (Greg Joseph kick), 8:22. Colts 33–7. **Drive: 7 plays, 88 yards, 2:54.**
- IND – Chase McLaughlin 52-yard field goal, 4:53. Colts 36–7. **Drive: 6 plays, 26 yards, 3:29.**
- MIN – C. J. Ham 1-yard run (Greg Joseph kick), 1:13. Colts 36–14. **Drive: 8 plays, 75 yards, 3:40.**

**Fourth quarter**

- MIN – Justin Jefferson 8-yard pass from Kirk Cousins (Greg Joseph kick), 12:53. Colts 36–21. **Drive: 6 plays, 61 yards, 2:14.**
- MIN – Adam Thielen 1-yard pass from Kirk Cousins (Greg Joseph kick), 5:30. Colts 36–28. **Drive: 5 plays, 50 yards, 1:36.**
- MIN – Dalvin Cook 64-yard pass from Kirk Cousins (Kirk Cousins–T. J. Hockenson pass), 2:15. Tied 36–36. **Drive: 1 play, 64 yards, 0:13.**

**Overtime**

- MIN – Greg Joseph 40-yard field goal, 0:03. Vikings 39–36. **Drive: 6 plays, 60 yards, 1:38.**

**Top passers**

- IND – Matt Ryan – 19/33, 182 yards, TD
- MIN – Kirk Cousins – 34/54, 460 yards, 4 TD, 2 INT

**Top rushers**

- IND – Zack Moss – 24 rushes, 81 yards
- MIN – Dalvin Cook – 17 rushes, 95 yards

**Top receivers**

- IND – Michael Pittman Jr. – 10 receptions, 60 yards
- MIN – K. J. Osborn – 10 receptions, 157 yards, TD

The Colts blew a 33–0 lead and ending up losing in overtime. After the game, Jeff Saturday benched Matt Ryan in favor of Nick Foles for next week's game.

==== Week 16: vs. Los Angeles Chargers ====
Week 16: Los Angeles Chargers at Indianapolis Colts – Game summary

Quarter	1	2	3	4	Total
**Chargers**	0	10	3	7	**20**
Colts	0	3	0	0	**3**

at Lucas Oil Stadium, Indianapolis, Indiana

- Date: December 26
- Game time: 8:15 p.m. EST
- Game weather: None (retractable roof closed)
- Game attendance: 65,576
- Referee: Clay Martin
- TV announcers (WISH-TV/ESPN): Joe Buck, Troy Aikman and Lisa Salters
- Recap, Game Book

Game information

**First quarter**

- No scoring plays.

**Second quarter**

- LAC – Austin Ekeler 1-yard run (Cameron Dicker kick), 8:41. Chargers 7–0. **Drive: 13 plays, 70 yards, 7:26.**
- IND – Chase McLaughlin 46-yard field goal, 4:21. Chargers 7–3. **Drive: 8 plays, 60 yards, 4:20.**
- LAC – Cameron Dicker 24-yard field goal, 0:00. Chargers 10–3. **Drive: 13 plays, 69 yards, 4:21.**

**Third quarter**

- LAC – Cameron Dicker 21-yard field goal, 6:01. Chargers 13–3. **Drive: 8 plays, 23 yards, 4:02.**

**Fourth quarter**

- LAC – Austin Ekeler 1-yard run (Cameron Dicker kick), 8:20. Chargers 20–3. **Drive: 12 plays, 88 yards, 6:33.**

**Top passers**

- LAC – Justin Herbert – 24/31, 235 yards, INT
- IND – Nick Foles – 17/29, 143 yards, 3 INT

**Top rushers**

- LAC – Austin Ekeler – 18 rushes, 67 yards, 2 TD
- IND – Zack Moss – 12 rushes, 65 yards

**Top receivers**

- LAC – Keenan Allen – 11 receptions, 104 yards
- IND – Jelani Woods – 3 receptions, 43 yards

The Colts were eliminated after the loss.

==== Week 17: at New York Giants ====
Week 17: Indianapolis Colts at New York Giants – Game summary

Quarter	1	2	3	4	Total
Colts	3	0	7	0	**10**
**Giants**	0	24	7	7	**38**

at MetLife Stadium, East Rutherford, New Jersey

- Date: January 1
- Game time: 1:00 p.m. EST
- Game weather: Fair, 53 °F (12 °C)
- Game attendance: 77,399
- Referee: Craig Wrolstad
- TV announcers (CBS): Kevin Harlan, Trent Green and Melanie Collins
- Recap, Game Book

Game information

**First quarter**

- IND - Chase McLaughlin 23-yard field goal, 2:26. Colts 3–0. **Drive: 9 plays, 75 yards, 5:50.**

**Second quarter**

- NYG - Richie James 6-yard pass from Daniel Jones (Graham Gano kick), 10:38. Giants 7–3. **Drive: 11 plays, 71 yards, 6:48.**
- NYG - Isaiah Hodgins 6-yard pass from Daniel Jones (Graham Gano kick), 4:21. Giants 14–3. **Drive: 9 plays, 64 yards, 4:49.**
- NYG - Landon Collins 52-yard interception return (Graham Gano kick), 1:45. Giants 21–3. **Drive: 6 plays, 21 yards, 2:36.**
- NYG - Graham Gano 36-yard field goal, 0:00. Giants 24–3. **Drive: 9 plays, 43 yards, 0:46.**

**Third quarter**

- NYG - Daniel Jones 18-yard rush (Graham Gano kick), 10:40, Giants 31–3. **Drive: 6 plays, 62 yards, 3:19.**
- IND - Michael Pittman Jr. 6-yard pass from Sam Ehlinger, 2:08. Giants 31–10. **Drive: 16 plays, 68 yards, 8:32.**

**Fourth quarter**

- NYG - Daniel Jones 10-yard rush (Graham Gano kick), 11:57. Giants 38–10. **Drive: 8 plays, 70 yards, 5:11.**

**Top passers**

- IND - Nick Foles - 8/13, 81 yards, INT
- NYG - Daniel Jones - 19/24, 177 yards, 2 TD

**Top rushers**

- IND - Zack Moss - 15 carries, 74 yards
- NYG - Daniel Jones - 11 carries, 91 yards, 2 TD

**Top receivers**

- IND - Parris Campbell - 3 receptions, 52 yards
- NYG - Richie James - 7 receptions, 76 yards, 1 TD

==== Week 18: vs. Houston Texans ====
Week 18: Houston Texans at Indianapolis Colts – Game summary

Quarter	1	2	3	4	Total
**Texans**	10	7	7	8	**32**
Colts	7	0	14	10	**31**

at Lucas Oil Stadium, Indianapolis, Indiana

- Date: January 8
- Game time: 1:00 p.m. EST
- Game weather: None (retractable roof closed)
- Game attendance: 63,655
- Referee: Jerome Boger
- TV announcers (CBS): Spero Dedes and Jay Feely
- Recap, Game Book

Game information

**First quarter**

- HOU – Brandin Cooks 11-yard pass from Davis Mills (Kaʻimi Fairbairn kick), 11:17. Texans 7–0. **Drive: 7 plays, 75 yards, 3:43.**
- HOU – Kaʻimi Fairbairn 37-yard field goal, 9:40. Texans 10–0. **Drive: 4 plays, -1 yards, 1:31.**
- IND – Michael Pittman Jr. 1-yard pass from Sam Ehlinger (Chase McLaughlin kick), 3:56. Texans 10–7. **Drive: 11 plays, 75 yards, 5:44.**

**Second quarter**

- HOU – Jonathan Greenard 39-yard interception return (Kaʻimi Fairbairn kick), 10:30. Texans 17–7.

**Third quarter**

- IND – Zack Moss 15-yard run (Chase McLaughlin kick), 6:40. Texans 17–14. **Drive: 5 plays, 49 yards, 2:48.**
- HOU – Jordan Akins 19-yard pass from Davis Mills (Kaʻimi Fairbairn kick), 3:51. Texans 24–14. **Drive: 5 plays, 75 yards, 2:49.**
- IND – Rodney McLeod 27-yard interception return (Chase McLaughlin kick), 0:52. Texans 24–21.

**Fourth quarter**

- IND – Mo Alie-Cox 4-yard pass from Sam Ehlinger (Chase McLaughlin kick), 10:30. Colts 28–24. **Drive: 7 plays, 58 yards, 4:30.**
- IND – Chase McLaughlin 54-yard field goal, 3:33. Colts 31–24. **Drive: 10 plays, 40 yards, 5:24.**
- HOU – Jordan Akins 28-yard pass from Davis Mills (Davis Mills pass to Jordan Akins), 0:50. Texans 32–31. **Drive: 14 plays, 83 yards, 2:43.**

**Top passers**

- HOU – Davis Mills – 22/38, 298 yards, 3 TD, 2 INT
- IND – Sam Ehlinger – 23/35, 209 yards, 2 TD, 2 INT

**Top rushers**

- HOU – Dare Ogunbowale – 11 rushes, 33 yards
- IND – Zack Moss – 18 rushes, 114 yards, TD

**Top receivers**

- HOU – Brandin Cooks – 5 receptions, 106 yards, TD
- IND – Deon Jackson – 6 receptions, 75 yards

=== Standings ===
==== Division ====
AFC South
	W	L	T	PCT	DIV	CONF	PF	PA	STK
^{(4)} Jacksonville Jaguars	9	8	0	.529	4–2	8–4	404	350	W5
Tennessee Titans	7	10	0	.412	3–3	5–7	298	359	L7
Indianapolis Colts	4	12	1	.265	1–4–1	4–7–1	289	427	L7
Houston Texans	3	13	1	.206	3–2–1	3–8–1	289	420	W1

==== Conference ====
AFC
#	Team	Division	W	L	T	PCT	DIV	CONF	SOS	SOV	STK
**Division leaders**
1	Kansas City Chiefs	West	14	3	0	.824	6–0	9–3	.453	.422	W5
2	Buffalo Bills	East	13	3	0	.813	4–2	9–2	.489	.471	W7
3	Cincinnati Bengals	North	12	4	0	.750	3–3	8–3	.507	.490	W8
4	Jacksonville Jaguars	South	9	8	0	.529	4–2	8–4	.467	.438	W5
**Wild cards**
5 (Note: LA Chargers claimed the No. 5 seed over Baltimore based on conference record (7–5 vs. 6–6).)	Los Angeles Chargers	West	10	7	0	.588	2–4	7–5	.443	.341	L1
6	Baltimore Ravens	North	10	7	0	.588	3–3	6–6	.509	.456	L2
7 (Note: Miami finished ahead of Pittsburgh based on head-to-head victory, claiming the 7th and final playoff spot.)	Miami Dolphins	East	9	8	0	.529	3–3	7–5	.537	.457	W1
**Did not qualify for the postseason**
8	Pittsburgh Steelers	North	9	8	0	.529	3–3	5–7	.519	.451	W4
9	New England Patriots	East	8	9	0	.471	3–3	6–6	.502	.415	L1
10 (Note: NY Jets and Tennessee finished ahead of Cleveland based on conference record (5–7 vs. 4–8).) (Note: NY Jets finished ahead of Tennessee based on common record (3–3 vs. 2–4 against: Buffalo, Cincinnati, Denver, Green Bay, Jacksonville).)	New York Jets	East	7	10	0	.412	2–4	5–7	.538	.458	L6
11	Tennessee Titans	South	7	10	0	.412	3–3	5–7	.509	.336	L7
12	Cleveland Browns	North	7	10	0	.412	3–3	4–8	.524	.492	L1
13	Las Vegas Raiders	West	6	11	0	.353	3–3	5–7	.474	.397	L3
14	Denver Broncos	West	5	12	0	.294	1–5	3–9	.481	.465	W1
15	Indianapolis Colts	South	4	12	1	.265	1–4–1	4–7–1	.512	.500	L7
16	Houston Texans	South	3	13	1	.206	3–2–1	3–8–1	.481	.402	W1
**Tiebreakers** (Note: When breaking ties for three or more teams under the NFL's rules, they are first broken within divisions, then comparing only the highest ranked remaining team from each division.)
