= Rhyne (name) =

Rhyne is a given name and surname. People with the name include:

== Given name ==
- Rhyne Howard (born 2000), American basketball player
- Rhyne Hughes (born 1983), American baseball player
- Rhyne Williams (born 1991), American tennis player

== Surname ==
- Aaron Rhyne, American video and production designer
- Forrest Rhyne (born 1999), American football player
- Hal Rhyne (1899–1971), American baseball player
- Janie Rhyne (1913–1995), American art therapist
- Melvin Rhyne (1936–2013), American jazz organist
- Theresa-Marie Rhyne, American visualization expert
- Timothy B. Rhyne, American research engineer

== See also ==
- Lenoir–Rhyne University, a private university in Hickory, North Carolina, United States
