= Julian Blackmon =

American football player (born 1998)

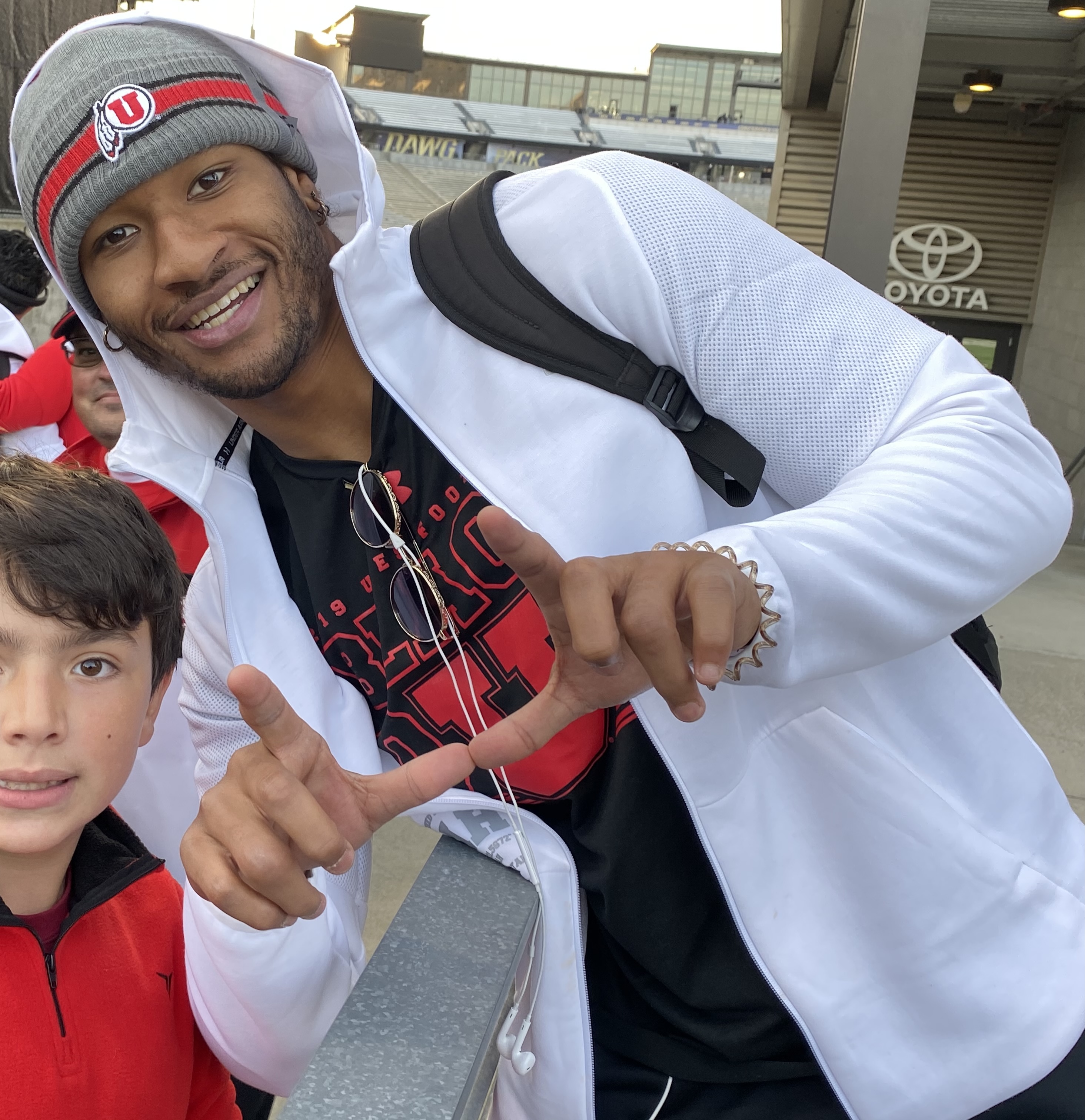
- Blackmon with Utah in 2019

No. 23 – New Orleans Saints
- Position: Safety
- Roster status: Active

Personal information
- Born: August 24, 1998 (age 28); Layton, Utah, U.S.
- Listed height: 6 ft 0 in (1.83 m)
- Listed weight: 202 lb (92 kg)

Career information
- High school: Layton
- College: Utah (2016–2019)
- NFL draft: 2020: 3rd round, 85th overall pick

Career history
- Indianapolis Colts (2020–2024); New Orleans Saints (2025–present)

Awards and highlights
- Second-team All-Pac-12 (2018)

Career NFL statistics as of 2025
- Total tackles: 307
- Sacks: 1.5
- Forced fumbles: 2
- Fumble recoveries: 4
- Pass deflections: 22
- Interceptions: 10
- Defensive touchdowns: 1
- Stats at Pro Football Reference

Julian Blackmon (born August 24, 1998) is an American professional football safety for the New Orleans Saints of the National Football League (NFL). He played college football for the Utah Utes.

== Early life ==
Blackmon attended Layton High School in Layton, Utah. He played cornerback and wide receiver in high school. A 3-star recruit, Blackmon committed to Utah to play college football over offers from Idaho, Southern Utah, and Weber State. Blackmon also played basketball in high school.

== College career ==
Blackmon played at Utah from 2016 to 2019. He played his first three years as a cornerback before switching to safety for his senior season. As a sophomore in 2017, he was named the MVP of the 2017 Heart of Dallas Bowl. As a senior in 2019, he was named a first-team All-American by Sports Illustrated and The Athletic. He finished his career starting 39 of 48 games, recording 158 tackles, nine interceptions, 1.5 sacks and two touchdowns.

== Professional career ==
=== Pre-draft ===
Former NFL executive Gil Brandt had Blackmon ranked as the 11th best safety prospect in the draft (143rd overall). Kevin Hanson of Sports Illustrated ranked him as the ninth best safety prospect in the 2020 NFL Draft. NFL.com analyst Lance Zierlein projected Blackmon to be selected in the fourth or fifth round of the 2020 NFL Draft.

"Anytime you see a player with as diverse a positional background as Blackmon has it's always intriguing. Him being a former cornerback isn't that big of a positive in his favor in my book though because... well... he wasn't that good of a corner. He's never going to be a physical presence at safety and his range on the back end isn't terribly impressive. Without a great feel for the safety position yet, he's kind of in no man's land."

— Mike Renner (Pro Football Focus)

Pre-draft measurables
Height	Weight	Arm length	Hand span	Wingspan	Wonderlic
5 ft 11 3/4 in (1.82 m)	187 lb (85 kg)	31 in (0.79 m)	9 in (0.23 m)	6 ft 3 1/4 in (1.91 m)	22
All values from NFL Combine

=== Indianapolis Colts ===
==== 2020 ====
The Indianapolis Colts selected Blackmon in the third round (85th overall) pick in the 2020 NFL draft. Blackmon was the eighth safety drafted.

External videos
- Colts draft Julian Blackmon No. 85

"Really it came down to I didn’t want to lose him behind us. We thought there was a chance he would be there in the third. We were worried if he’d be there in the fourth. He’s got the ACL injury. We know he probably won’t be ready until late August/early September, which means that he might not really help us until October. He’s a rangy, fast, athletic safety that can play corner and he can play in the nickel. He has a lot of value in our defense and can play a bunch of multiple spots. This is his first year playing safety and we liked him at corner, too. We feel lucky to get him. He’s a talented young man."

— Chris Ballard (Colts' General Manager)

On June 16, 2020, the Indianapolis Colts signed Blackmon to a four–year, $4.62 million contract that includes an initial signing bonus of $926,436.

On July 27, 2020, the Indianapolis Colts placed him on the active/non-football injury list as he was still recovering from a torn ACL. On August 31, 2020, the Colts removed him from the active/NFI list and officially added him to their active roster. Head coach Frank Reich named him the third free safety on the depth chart to begin the season, behind starter Malik Hooker and primary backup George Odum. Khari Willis was selected as the starting strong safety with Tavon Wilson as a backup.

He was inactive during a 27–20 loss at the Jacksonville Jaguars in Week 1 due to a knee injury. On September 20, 2020, Blackmon made his professional regular season debut and recorded two solo tackles and two pass deflections during a 28–11 win against the Minnesota Vikings. Starting free safety Malik Hooker tore his achilles during the game and was subsequently placed on injured reserve. Head coach Frank Reich appointed Blackmon as his replacement at free safety before Week 3. In Week 3, he earned his first career start, but was limited to one solo tackle as the Colts routed the New York Jets 36–7. On October 4, 2020, Blackmon made one solo tackle, a season-high three pass deflections, and made his first career interception on a pass thrown by Nick Foles to wide receiver Anthony Miller during a 19–11 win at the Chicago Bears. In Week 6, Blackmon made two solo tackles, broke up a pass, and intercepted a pass thrown by Joe Burrow to wide receiver Tyler Boyd with less than 48 seconds left in the fourth quarter to secure the Colts' 31–27 win against the Cincinnati Bengals. On November 22, 2020, Blackmon collected a season-high five solo tackles and was responsible for forcing a fumble by wide receiver Marquez Valdes-Scantling that was subsequently recovered by Colts' teammate DeForest Buckner for a turnover during overtime and eventually led to a 39-yard game-winning field goal by Rodrigo Blankenship as the Colts defeated the Green Bay Packers 34–31. He finished his rookie season with a total of 42 combined tackles (35 solo), six pass deflections, and one interception in 15 games and 14 starts.

==== 2021 ====
He entered training camp slated to be the starting free safety following the departure of Malik Hooker. Defensive coordinator Matt Eberflus selected Blackmon to begin the season as the starting free safety and paired him with strong safety Khari Willis.

On September 26, 2021, Blackmon collected a season-high 11 solo tackles during a 16–25 loss at the Tennessee Titans. On October 20, 2021, the Colts announced that Blackmon had suffered a torn Achilles during practice and would have to undergo surgery and miss the remainder of the season. On October 23, 2021, the Colts officially placed him on injured reserve for the rest of the season. He finished the season with 34 combined tackles (27 solo) and one pass deflection in six games and six starts.

==== 2022 ====
Former Las Vegas Raiders' defensive coordinator Gus Bradley accepted the same position with the Colts after Matt Eberflus accepted a head coaching position with the Chicago Bears. During training camp, Blackmon competed to be a starting safety against Rodney McLeod, Armani Watts, and rookie Nick Cross. Head coach Frank Reich named him the starting free safety and paired him with strong safety Nick Cross.

He was sidelined for three consecutive games (Weeks 4–6) after injuring his ankle. On November 6, 2022, he made four combined tackles (two solo) and recorded the first sack of his career on Mac Jones as the Colts were routed 3–26 at the New England Patriots. On November 7, 2022, the Colts announced their decision to fire head coach Frank Reich after a disappointing 3–5–1 start. Former Indianapolis Colts' center Jeff Saturday was unexpectedly appointed to interim head coach. On December 22, 2022, Blackmon made four combined tackles (two solo), a pass deflection, and returned an interception thrown by Kirk Cousins to wide receiver Jalen Reagor for a 17–yard touchdown to mark the first touchdown of his career during a 36–39 overtime loss at the Minnesota Vikings. The following week, he collected a season-high nine combined tackles (five solo) as the Colts were routed 3–20 by the Los Angeles Chargers in Week 16. He finished the 2022 NFL season with a total of 50 combined tackles (36 solo), two pass deflections, one interception, one fumble recovery, one sack, and a touchdown in 14 games and 11 starts.

==== 2023 ====
On February 14, 2023, the Indianapolis Colts announced the hiring of Philadelphia Eagles' offensive coordinator Shane Steichen as their head coach. Steichen retained Gus Bradley as the defensive coordinator. Blackmon entered training camp as the de facto starting free safety following the departures of Rodney McLeod and Armani Watts. Head coach Shane Steichen named him the starting free safety to begin the season and paired him with strong safety Rodney Thomas II.

On September 24, 2023, Blackmon collected a career-high 12 combined tackles (six solo) during a 22–19 overtime victory at the Baltimore Ravens. In Week 5, he recorded five combined tackles (four solo), broke up a pass, and sealed the game with an interception on a pass thrown by Ryan Tannehill to wide receiver DeAndre Hopkins in the closing seconds in the fourth quarter of a 23–16 win against the Tennessee Titans. On November 12, 2023, Blackmon recorded four solo tackles, two pass deflections, and had the first of two late fourth quarter interceptions by himself and fellow safety Rodney Thomas II to secure a 10–6 win at the New England Patriots. In Week 15, he made two solo tackles, a pass deflection, recovered a fumble, and intercepted a pass attempt by Mitchell Trubisky to wide receiver George Pickens as the Colts defeated the Pittsburgh Steelers 13–30. In Week 16, he made one solo tackle before exiting in the second quarter of a 10-29 loss at the Atlanta Falcons after injuring his shoulder. On December 26, 2023, the Colts officially placed him on injured reserve due to his shoulder injury and he remained inactive for the last two games (Weeks 17–18) of the season. He finished the season with a career-high 88 combined tackles (65 solo), a team-high eight passes defensed, a career-high four interceptions, and two fumble recoveries in 15 games and 15 starts. He received an overall grade of 68.3 from Pro Football Focus in 2023, ranking 38th among 95 qualifying safeties.

==== 2024 ====
On April 2, 2024, the Indianapolis Colts re-signed Blackmon to a one–year, $3.70 million contract extension that includes $3.19 million guaranteed and an initial signing bonus of $1.86 million. Blackmon returned as the starting free safety and was again paired with starting strong safety Nick Cross.

On September 8, 2024, Blackmon started in the Indianapolis Colts' home-opener against the Houston Texans and collected a career-high 13 combined tackles (ten solo) during a 27–29 loss. He was inactive during a 10–16 loss at the Green Bay Packers in Week 2 due to a shoulder injury. In Week 6, he made three solo tackles, a pass deflection, and had a key interception off a pass by Will Levis to wide receiver Calvin Ridley with less than five minutes left in the fourth quarter to help secure a 20–17 victory at the Tennessee Titans. On January 5, 2025, Blackmon recorded five solo tackles, deflected a pass, and intercepted a pass thrown by Mac Jones to wide receiver Brian Thomas Jr. as the Colts defeated the Jacksonville Jaguars in overtime 26–23. He finished the season with 86 combined tackles (62 solo), four pass deflections, three interceptions, a fumble recovery, and was credited with half a sack in 16 games and 16 starts. He received an overall grade of 69.3 from Pro Football Focus, which ranked 48th among 170 qualifying safeties.

=== New Orleans Saints ===
On July 23, 2025, Blackmon signed a one-year, $5.5 million contract with the New Orleans Saints. He was named a starting safety in Week 1, but suffered a torn labrum in the game and was placed on season-ending injured reserve.

Blackmon signed a one-year contract extension with New Orleans on January 20, 2026.

== NFL career statistics ==
Legend
**Bold**	Career high

=== Regular season statistics ===
Year	Team	Games		Tackles				Fumbles				Interceptions				
Year	Team	GP	GS	Cmb	Solo	Ast	Sck	FF	FR	Yds	TD	Int	Yds	Lng	TD	PD
2020	IND	15	14	42	35	7	0.0	**1**	0	—	—	2	19	15	0	6
2021	IND	6	6	34	27	7	0.0	**1**	0	—	—	0	—	—	—	1
2022	IND	14	11	50	36	14	**1.0**	0	1	**34**	0	1	17	17	1	2
2023	IND	15	15	**88**	**65**	23	0.0	0	**2**	2	0	**4**	**38**	**25**	0	**8**
2024	IND	**16**	**16**	86	62	**24**	0.5	0	1	0	0	3	27	17	0	4
2025	NO	1	1	7	4	3	0.0	0	0	—	—	0	—	—	—	1
Career		67	63	307	229	78	1.5	2	4	36	0	10	101	25	1	22

=== Postseason statistics ===
Year	Team	Games		Tackles				Fumbles				Interceptions				
Year	Team	GP	GS	Cmb	Solo	Ast	Sck	FF	FR	Yds	TD	Int	Yds	Lng	TD	PD
2020	IND	1	1	5	5	0	0.0	0	0	—	—	0	—	—	—	0
Career		1	1	5	5	0	0.0	0	0	—	—	0	—	—	—	0

== Personal life ==
In February 2024, Blackmon announced his engagement to his girlfriend Tyra Gilmore. They got married on July 12, 2024.
