= Barry Cohen =

Barry Cohen may refer to:

- Barry Cohen (politician), Australian politician
- Barry Cohen (attorney), American attorney in Florida
- Barry Marc Cohen, American art therapist
- Barry Crane, né Barry Cohen, television producer and director, and bridge player
