= Nick Cross (American football) =

American football player (born 2001)

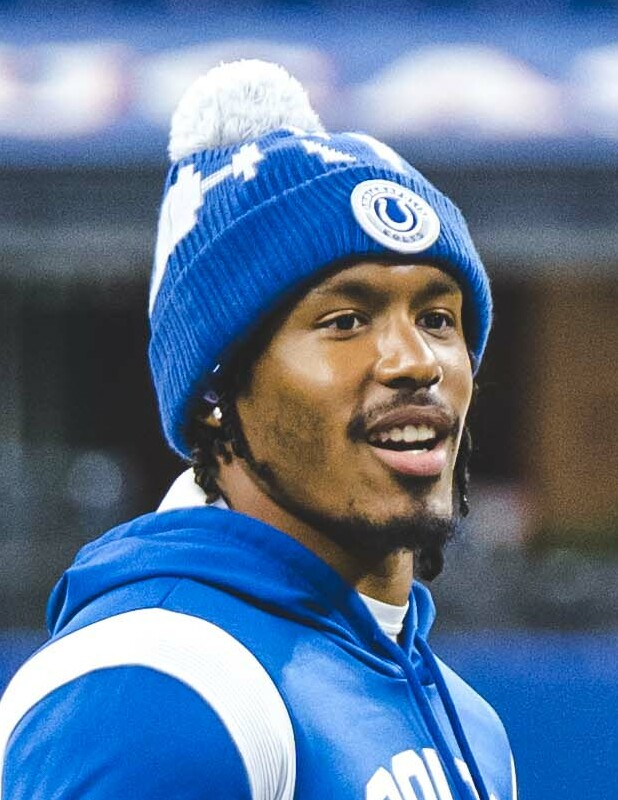
- Cross with the Indianapolis Colts in 2022

No. 25 – Washington Commanders
- Position: Safety
- Roster status: Active

Personal information
- Born: September 10, 2001 (age 25); Bowie, Maryland, U.S.
- Listed height: 6 ft 0 in (1.83 m)
- Listed weight: 212 lb (96 kg)

Career information
- High school: DeMatha Catholic (Hyattsville, Maryland)
- College: Maryland (2019–2021)
- NFL draft: 2022: 3rd round, 96th overall pick

Career history
- Indianapolis Colts (2022–2025); Washington Commanders (2026−present)

Career NFL statistics as of Week 10, 2026
- Tackles: 358
- Sacks: 3.5
- Forced fumbles: 2
- Fumble recoveries: 2
- Pass deflections: 15
- Interceptions: 6
- Stats at Pro Football Reference

Nicolas Cross (born September 10, 2001) is an American professional football safety for the Washington Commanders of the National Football League (NFL). Cross played college football for the Maryland Terrapins and was selected by the Indianapolis Colts in the third round of the 2022 NFL draft.

== Early life ==
Cross was born on September 10, 2001, the son of Michael and Anna Cross. His father, Michael, is from Jamaica and his mother from Trinidad and Tobago. He attended the St. Jerome Academy in Hyattsville, Maryland for his early education.

Cross attended DeMatha Catholic High School in Hyattsville, Maryland. He played in the 2019 Army All-American Bowl. Cross was rated as four star recruit. He originally committed to Florida State University to play college football but switched to the University of Maryland, College Park. Cross also ran track while at DeMatha Catholic. He competed in the 60M, 100M, 200M, 4x100M relay, and 4x200M relay. He holds a personal best of 6.68s in the 60M.

== College career ==
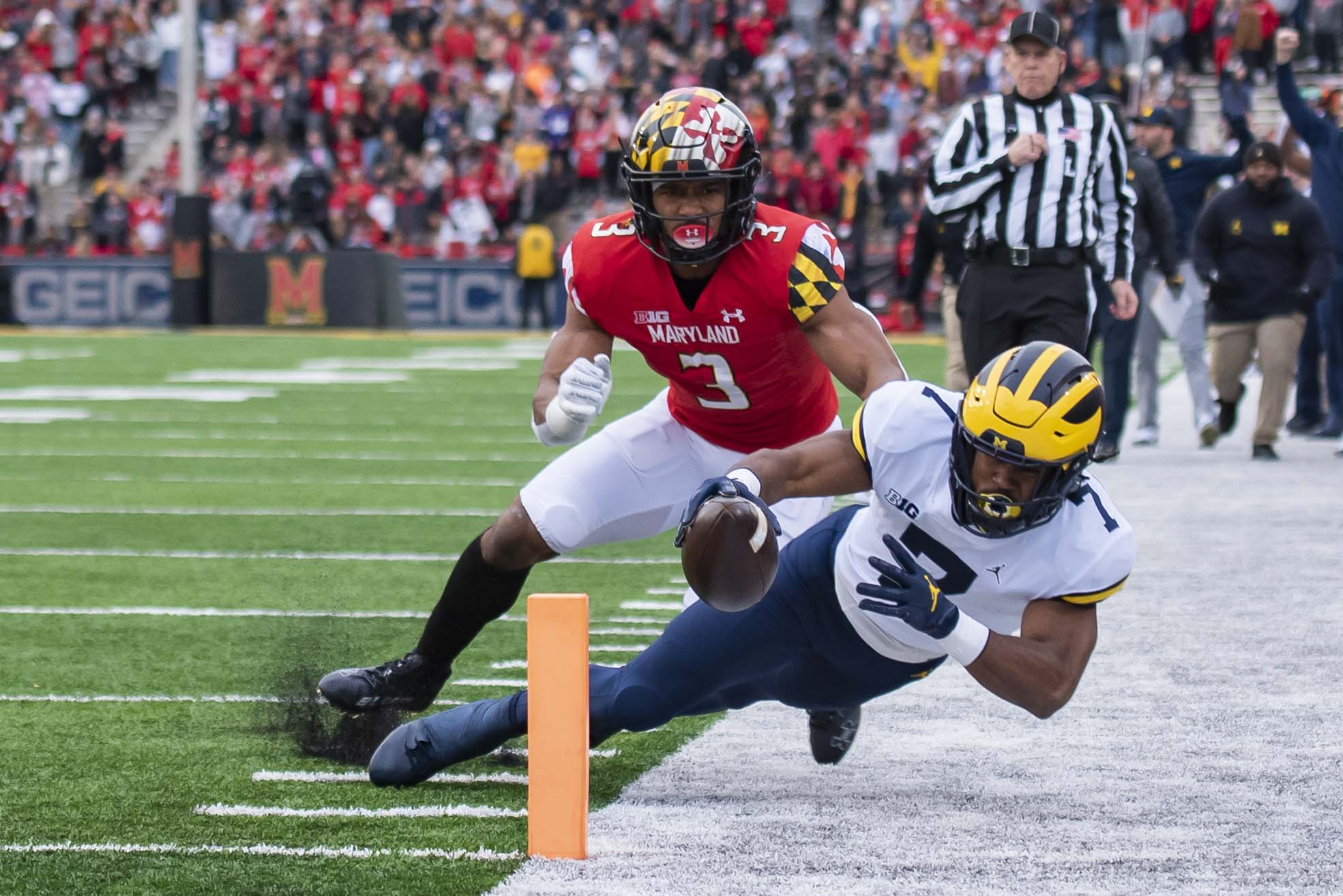
Cross (left) with the Maryland Terrapins in 2021

Cross played at Maryland from 2019 to 2021. During his career he started 21 of 29 games and recorded 134 tackles, six interceptions, three forced fumbles, and four sacks. Cross was voted Honorable Mention All-Big Ten in each of his three seasons at Maryland. After the 2021 season, he decided to forgo his senior season and enter the 2022 NFL draft.

== Professional career ==
=== Pre-draft ===
He participated in the 2022 NFL Scouting Combine where he had the fastest 40 yard dash among safeties, with a time of 4.34 seconds. NFL media analyst Daniel Jeremiah ranked Cross as the seventh best safety prospect in the draft (68th overall). Michael Renner of Pro Football Focus ranked him as the fourth best safety on his big board (64th overall). Jeff Legwold of ESPN had him as the seventh best safety in the draft (71st overall). Bleacher Report had Cross ranked as the sixth best safety prospect (68th overall). Kevin Hanson of Sports Illustrated ranked him sixth among all safeties. NFL draft analysts projected Cross would be selected in either the second or third round of the 2022 NFL draft.

External videos
- Nick Cross runs 4.34s 40-yard dash

Pre-draft measurables
Height	Weight	Arm length	Hand span	Wingspan	40-yard dash	10-yard split	20-yard split	20-yard shuttle	Three-cone drill	Vertical jump	Broad jump	Bench press
6 ft 0 1/8 in (1.83 m)	212 lb (96 kg)	31 1/2 in (0.80 m)	9 in (0.23 m)	6 ft 4 in (1.93 m)	4.34 s	1.46 s	2.51 s	4.21 s	6.85 s	37.0 in (0.94 m)	10 ft 10 in (3.30 m)	21 reps
All values from NFL Combine/Pro Day

=== Indianapolis Colts ===
==== 2022 ====
The Indianapolis Colts selected Cross in the third round (96th overall) of the 2022 NFL draft. The Colts executed a trade with the Denver Broncos in order to secure the selection of Cross by agreeing to trade their 2022 fifth-round pick (179th overall) and a third-round pick (67th overall) in the 2023 NFL draft in exchange for the 2022 third-round pick (96th overall) they used immediately to select Cross. He was the eighth safety drafted in 2022 and was also the youngest player to be selected in the 2022 NFL draft at 20 years old.

External videos
- Colts select Nick Cross No. 96 overall
- Draft Call: Nick Cross

On May 13, 2022, the Indianapolis Colts signed Cross to a four–year, $5.06 million rookie contract that includes an initial signing bonus of $864,100.

Throughout training camp, Cross competed against Rodney McLeod for the starting job at strong safety after it became vacant following the sudden retirement of Khari Willis. Head coach Frank Reich named him the starting strong safety to begin the season and paired him with free safety Julian Blackmon.

On September 11, 2022, Cross made his professional regular season debut and earned his first career start in the Indianapolis Colts' season-opener at the Houston Texans and made four solo tackles as they tied 20–20 after overtime. The following week, he collected a season-high five combined tackles (three solo) during a 0–24 loss at the Jacksonville Jaguars in Week 2. Entering Week 3, defensive coordinator Gus Bradley opted to bench Cross and named Rodney McLeod the starting strong safety in his place. On November 7, 2022, the Colts announced their decision to fire head coach Frank Reich sfter a disappointing 3–5–1 start. Former Colts' center, Jeff Saturday, was unexpectedly appointed interim head coach. He finished his rookie season during the 2022 NFL season with only 17 combined tackles (11 solo), a forced fumble, and one fumble in 16 games and two starts. He was relegated to solely appear on special teams and was limited to very few snaps on defense. As a special teams player, Cross earned a special teams grade of 90.0 from Pro Football Focus.

==== 2023 ====
During training camp, he competed to be a starting safety against Rodney Thomas II under defensive coordinator after it was open following the departure of Rodney McLeod. Head coach Shane Steichen named him a backup safety to begin the season with Julian Blackmon and Rodney Thomas II as the starting safeties.

On December 16, 2023, Cross made three combined tackles (one solo), a pass deflection, and had his first career interception on a pass attempt by Mitchell Trubisky to wide receiver George Pickens as the Colts defeated the Pittsburgh Steelers 30–13. In Week 17, he earned his first start of the season after Julian Blackmon was placed on injured reserve due to a shoulder injury. He collected a season-high nine combined tackles (six solo) as the Colts defeated the Las Vegas Raiders 23–20. He finished the 2023 NFL season with 39 combined tackles (24 solo), two pass deflections, and one interception, while appearing in all 17 games with only two starts. He received an overall grade of 71.8 from Pro Football Focus in 2023.

==== 2024 ====
He entered training camp as a possible candidate to be a starting safety, but had to compete for the role against Rodney Thomas II and Ronnie Harrison. Head coach Shane Steichen named Cross the starting strong safety to begin the season alongside free safety Julian Blackmon.

In Week 2, he collected a career-high 15 combined tackles (ten solo) as the Colts lost 10–16 at the Green Bay Packers. On October 6, 2024, Cross made five combined tackles (two solo), a pass deflection, and intercepted a pass by Trevor Lawrence to wide receiver Brian Thomas Jr. during a 34–37 loss at the Jacksonville Jaguars. On December 1, 2024, Cross recorded nine combined tackles (eight solo) and had his first career sack on quarterback Drake Maye for a two–yard loss during a 25–24 victory at the New England Patriots. The following week, he made five combined tackles (four solo), a pass deflection, and set a new career-high with his third interception of the season on a pass by Bo Nix to wide receiver Courtland Sutton during a 13–31 loss at the Denver Broncos in Week 15. He started all 17 games for the first time in his career and had a career-high 146 combined tackles (87 solo), five pass deflections, a career-high three interceptions, and one sack. He received an overall grade of 70.3 from Pro Football Focus in 2024, which ranked 45th among 171 qualifying safeties.

=== Washington Commanders ===
On March 13, 2026, Cross signed a two-year, $14 million contract with the Washington Commanders. Following the Week 2 game against the Dallas Cowboys, Cross was hospitalized in Dallas in order to have surgery for an internal injury.

== Career statistics ==
=== NFL ===
Legend
**Bold**	Career high

Year	Team	Games		Tackles					Interceptions						Fumbles				
Year	Team	GP	GS	Cmb	Solo	Ast	Sck	TFL	Int	Yds	Avg	Lng	TD	PD	FF	Fum	FR	Yds	TD
2022	IND	16	2	17	11	6	0.0	0	0	0	0.0	0	0	0	0	**1**	**1**	0	0
2023	IND	17	2	39	24	15	0.0	1	1	18	**18.0**	18	0	2	0	0	0	0	0
2024	IND	17	17	**146**	**87**	**59**	1.0	**6**	**3**	**25**	8.3	**20**	0	**5**	**1**	0	0	0	0
2025	IND	17	17	120	72	48	**2.5**	5	1	0	0.0	0	0	**5**	**1**	0	0	0	0
2026	WAS	6	6	36	22	14	0.0	5	1	0	0.0	0	0	3	0	0	2	0	0
Career		73	44	358	216	142	3.5	17	6	43	7.2	20	0	15	2	1	2	0	0

=== College ===
College statistics
Season	Team	GP	Tackles				Interceptions				
Season	Team	GP	Cmb	Solo	Ast	Sck	Int	Yds	Avg	TD	PD
2019	Maryland	11	45	30	15	0	2	0	0	0	5
2020	Maryland	4	23	14	9	1.0	0	0	0	0	3
2021	Maryland	12	66	44	22	3.0	3	55	18.3	0	2
Career		27	134	88	46	4.0	5	55	11.0	0	10
