= Lynne Tillman =

American novelist

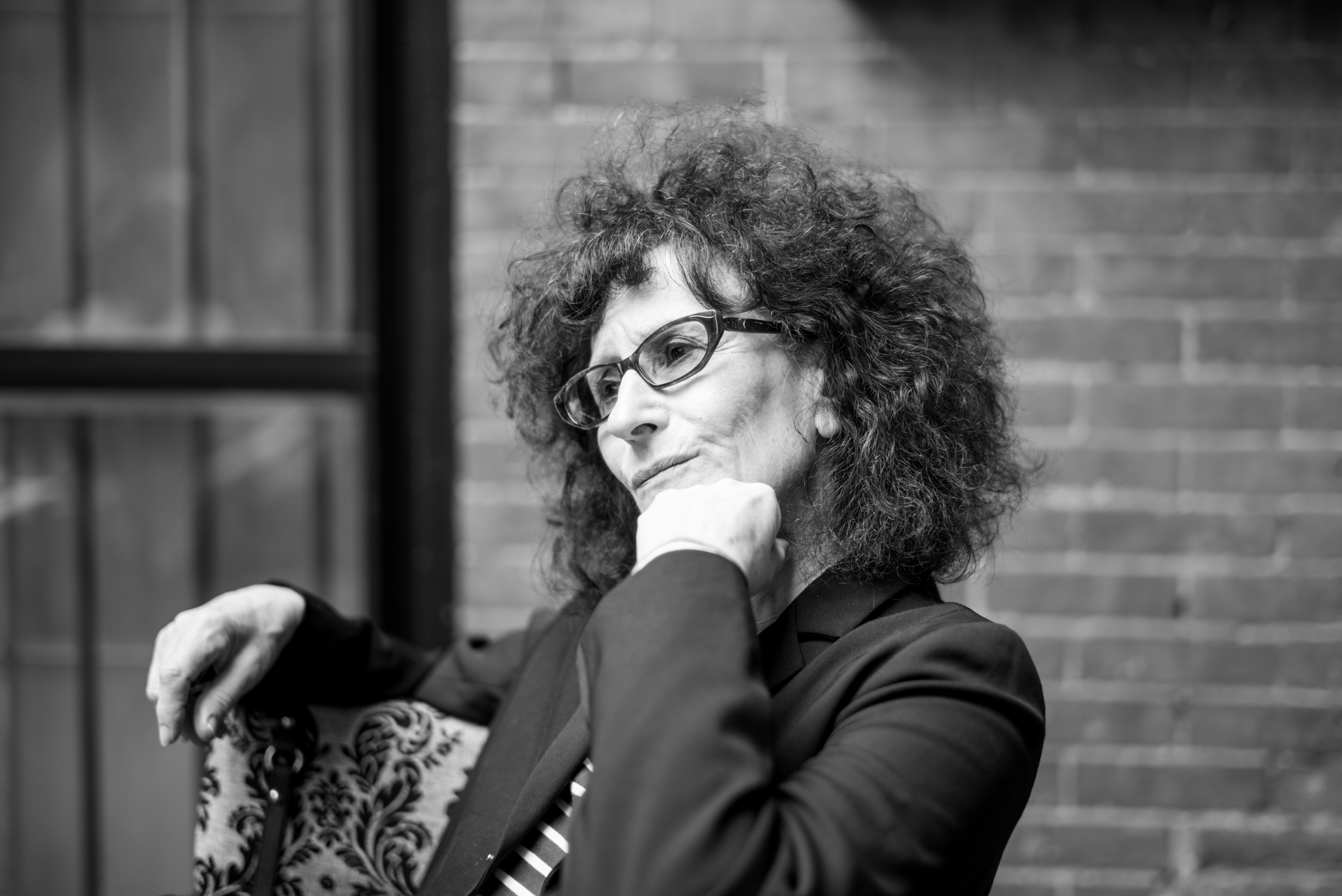
- Tillman at the Norwood club in Manhattan, 2016
- Occupations: Novelist; short story writer; essayist; cultural critic
- Spouse: David Hofstra
- Writing career
- Notable works: No Lease on Life; Cast in Doubt; Motion Sickness; Haunted Houses

Lynne Tillman (born January 1, 1947) is an American novelist, short story writer, and cultural critic. She is a professor/writer-in-residence in the Department of English at the University at Albany and teaches at the School of Visual Arts' Art Criticism and Writing MFA Program. Tillman is the author of six novels, five collections of short stories, two collection of essays, and two other non-fiction books. She writes a bi-monthly column "In These Intemperate Times" for Frieze magazine.

== Career ==
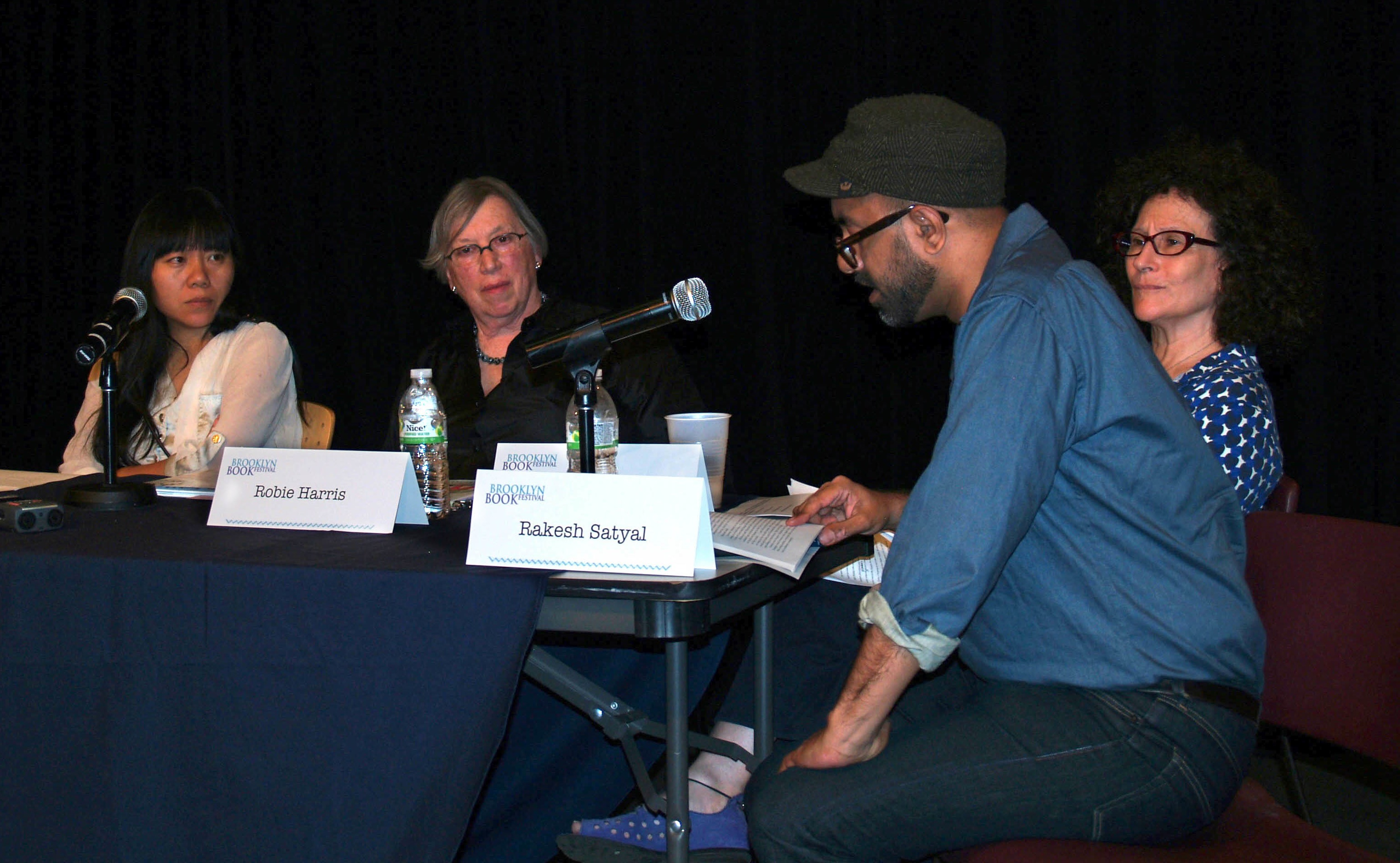
From left to right: Xiaolu Guo, Robie Harris, Rakesh Satyal and Tillman speaking on the effect of government surveillance on author self-censorship, with other authors at the 2014 Brooklyn Book Festival

=== Fiction ===
Tillman's novels include: American Genius, A Comedy (2006); No Lease on Life (1998), which was a finalist for a National Book Critics Award in Fiction; Cast in Doubt (1992); Motion Sickness (1991); and Haunted Houses (1987). In March 2018, her sixth novel Men and Apparitions was published by Soft Skull Press.

Absence Makes the Heart (1990) is Tillman's first collection of short stories. The Broad Picture (1997) is a collection of Tillman's essays, which were published originally in literary and art periodicals.

Her other story collections are: The Madame Realism Complex (1992); This Is Not It (2002), stories written in response to the work of 22 contemporary artists; Someday This Will Be Funny (2011); and The Complete Madame Realism and Other Stories.

=== Nonfiction ===
In 1995, Tillman's nonfiction work, The Velvet Years: Warhol's Factory 1965-1967, was published with photographs by Stephen Shore; it presented 18 Warhol Factory personalities' narratives, based on interviews with them, as well as her critical essay on Andy Warhol, his art and studio. Tillman is also the author of the nonfiction book The Life and Times of Jeannette Watson and Books & Co. (1999), a cultural and social history of a literary landmark where writers and artists congregated for nearly 20 years.

What Would Lynne Tillman Do? (2014), her second essay collection, was a Finalist for the National Book Critics Circle Award in Criticism in 2014.

== Personal life ==
In the 1970s, Tillman squatted in London with Heathcote Williams. As of 2019, she was living in Manhattan with the musician David Hofstra. Her personal papers were purchased by the Fales Library at New York University.

Tillman is a collector of the work of artist Caroline Goe.

== Awards and honors ==
- 2006 Guggenheim Fellowship
- 2014 National Book Critics Circle Award (Criticism) finalist for What Would Lynne Tillman Do?
- 2022 Fiction and Nonfiction Porter Award

== Bibliography ==
=== Novels ===
- Weird Fucks (1983)
- Haunted Houses (1987)
- Motion Sickness (1991)
- Cast in Doubt (1992)
- No Lease on Life (1998)
- American Genius, A Comedy (2006)
- Men and Apparitions (2018)

=== Short story collections ===
- Absence Makes the Heart (1990)
- The Madame Realism Complex (1992)
- This Is Not It (2002)
- Someday This Will Be Funny (2011)
- The Complete Madame Realism and Other Stories (2016)
- Thrilled to Death: Selected Stories (2025)

=== Nonfiction ===
- The Velvet Years: Warhol's Factory 1965–1967 (1995)
- The Broad Picture (1997)
- Bookstore: The Life and Times of Jeannette Watson and Books & Co. (1999)
- What Would Lynne Tillman Do? (2014)
- Mothercare: On Obligation, Love, Death, and Ambivalence (2022)
- The Mystery of Perception (with Taylor Lewandowski) (2025)

=== Interviews ===
- Yeh, James (Dec 2017 – Jan 2018). "Lynne Tillman". Interviews. Writers. The Believer. 14 (3): 66–70.
- The Intersection of Writing and Sculpture: Writer Lynne Tillman on Roni Horn
- Lynne Tillman: Men and Apparitions
- In Conversation: Lynne Tillman and Eileen Myles
- Emily LaBarge talks to Lynne Tillman about her new novel, Men and Apparitions.
- Finding the Question That Hasn’t Been Asked: An Interview with Lynne Tillman
- An Interview with Lynne Tillman
- An Interview with Lynne Tillman The novelist and critic discusses her new book of fiction—Men and Apparitions.
