= Caroline Goe =

American artist

Caroline Goe was a self-taught New York artist.

== Career ==
Very little is known about Goe's life, but she sold her work on Avenue B in New York's East Village neighborhood. Other sources say Goe sold her paintings on Third Ave and 9th St. Goe is described as a blonde woman, quiet, wearing a wool coat and dress and carrying many bags.

She made her paintings in oil paint on canvas, perhaps found in the trash of artists in her neighborhood. Some works were on paper or silky fabric; they were not on stretchers. The works featured religious motifs. The style is brushy and very colorful. She priced them cheaply at one or two dollars per piece.

Art therapist Barry Cohen purchased her work. Goe and Cohen arranged meetings by letter, as Goe had no phone. Her work was also bought by Lynne Tillman, Chris Martin and Robin Winters.

Goe disappeared in 1989.

An advertisement from 1990 for the Tartt Gallery in Washington, DC lists Goe as one of their artists. White Columns features an exhibition of Goe's work from the collection of Lynne Tillman in March 2019. It is the first show of her work.
