= Barry Marc Cohen =

Barry Marc Cohen (born November 1954) is an American art therapist, scholar, event producer, and art collector. He is known for his contribution to the theory and practice of art therapy, both in originating and researching a new assessment technique (the Diagnostic Drawing Series) and in understanding the art of people diagnosed with dissociative disorders. These endeavors have garnered him awards from the American Art Therapy Association and the International Society for the Study of Trauma and Dissociation.

== Scholar ==
In 1991, Cohen co-authored Multiple Personality Disorder From the Inside Out, personal accounts of what it means to live with the disorder written by people with the diagnosis. Cohen and his co-authors Esther Giller and Lynn W. were given the Distinguished Service Award by the International Society for the Study of Multiple Personality and Dissociation (now, the International Society for the Study of Trauma and Dissociation) in 1991 for creating a widely read book for the general audience on a misunderstood disorder.

=== The Diagnostic Drawing Series ===
The Diagnostic Drawing Series (DDS) was developed by Barry Cohen and art therapy colleagues (Cohen, Hammer, & Singer, 1988). In 1983, Cohen and his colleagues Shira Singer and Anna Reyner were awarded the annual Research Award of the American Art Therapy Association in recognition of the multi-site research design of the DDS. As an assessment tool, the DDS significantly differs from traditional methods of art-based interpretations that have dominated in previous decades (Cohen, Hammer, & Singer, 1988). The development of the DDS has purposefully shifted away from interpretive, subjective approaches in hopes of creating a more empirically based assessment and research tool. In doing so, Cohen and colleagues have demonstrated a relationship between art elements and psychiatric diagnoses. Cohen is the Director of the DDS Project, an international network of mental health professionals who use the Diagnostic Drawing Series clinically and in research. More than 65 studies related to the Diagnostic Drawing Series have been completed, and many are widely cited in peer-reviewed journals. Studies often address the graphic profiles of groups of subjects diagnosed with various psychiatric disorders—that is, how this group tends to draw which distinguishes them from all other groups. Cohen established the Diagnostic Drawing Series Archive near Washington, DC as a resource for researchers.

== Art therapist, conference producer, executive director ==
As a teenaged artist, Cohen was mentored by Charles "Li" Hidley, an expressionist painter who trained in New York and Mexico City. He studied painting and stage direction at Hampshire College. Cohen received a master's degree in art therapy at the University of Louisville in 1979, where his primary influence was pioneer gestalt art therapist Janie Rhyne.

In 1989, Cohen founded the Eastern Regional Conference on Trauma (also known as the Eastern Regional Conference on Abuse and Multiple Personality and the Eastern Regional Conference on Abuse, Trauma, and Dissociation), which he chaired and managed in Virginia for its seven-year duration. Two inpatient psychiatric units for the treatment of survivors of trauma, particularly those who were highly dissociative, were co-founded by Cohen and his partners. In 1995, he co-authored Telling Without Talking: Art as a Window into the World of Multiple Personality Disorder with Carol T. Cox, and the workbook Managing Traumatic Stress Through Art: Drawing from The Center with Mary Barnes and Anita Rankin.

From 2008 through 2021, Barry M. Cohen served as the executive director of Expressive Media Inc., a non-profit organization established by Judith A. Rubin and Eleanor C. Irwin dedicated to producing and distributing training films and videos on the expressive arts therapies. In 2010, he convened the annual Expressive Therapies Summit in New York City as a training opportunity for expressive therapists and other mental health professionals, which also functions to promote the educational efforts of Expressive Media Inc. In 2013, with Eliana Gil, he co-founded the Mid-Atlantic Play Therapy Training Institute, an annual conference promoting the integration of the expressive arts with play therapy, held just outside of Washington, DC. In 2017, with Ping Ho, Founder/Director of UCLArts & Healing, he launched and co-chaired the annual Expressive Therapies Summit:LA. After moving the Summits online in November 2020, a monthly training format was added, Singular Sessions from the Summit. As of 2022, Cohen continues his work as executive director of the Expressive Therapies Summits.

== Art and antiques ==
As an art collector, Cohen has loaned artworks to museums such as the Whitney Museum of American Art and Pennsylvania Academy of Fine Art (1987), the San Francisco Museum of Craft and Folk Art (1990), The Athenaeum in Alexandria, VA (1991), the Kentucky Folk Life Museum (1995), and the Contemporary Art Center of Virginia (1996). Works from his collection, including those by Red Grooms, Justin McCarthy, Harold Geesaman, Caroline Goe, and Thornton Dial have been published in art catalogues and books.

As an entrepreneur, Cohen created, produced, and promoted antiques fairs from 1994 to 2008, including: the York Tailgate Antiques Show/York County Classic Antiques Show (York, PA), the Center City Antiques Show (Philadelphia, PA), Antiques Manhattan (New York, NY), and the Historic Indian & World Tribal Arts show (Santa Fe, NM).

== Books ==
- Cohen, B., Barnes, M., & Rankin, A. (1995). Managing traumatic stress through art: Drawing from The center. Lutherville, MD: The Sidran Press. Sold over 8,000 copies in English. Korean edition: 예술을 통해 외상 후 스트레스 관리를, 2006.
- Cohen, B. & Cox, C. (1995). Telling without talking: Art as a window into the world of multiple personality. New York: W.W. Norton & Co. Sold over 6,000 copies.
- Cohen, B., Giller, E., & L.W. (Eds.). (1991). Multiple personality disorder from the inside out. Lutherville, MD: The Sidran Press. Sold over 70,000 copies.

== Selected papers and reports ==
- Cohen, B. & Mills, A. (1999). Skin/paper/bark: Body image, trauma, and the Diagnostic Drawing Series. In J. Goodwin & R. Attias (Eds.), Splintered reflections: Images of the body in trauma (pp. 203–221). New York: Basic Books.
- Cohen, B. (1996). Art and the dissociative paracosm: Uncommon realities. In L. Michaelson & W. Ray (Eds.), Handbook of dissociation: Theoretical, empirical and clinical perspectives (pp. 525–544). New York: Plenum.
- Courtois, C., Turkus, J., & Cohen, B. (1994). Development of an inpatient dissociative disorders unit. In M. B. Williams & J. F. Summer (Eds.), Handbook of post-traumatic therapy (pp. 463–473). Westport, CT: Greenwood Publishing.
- Cox, C.T. & Cohen, B. (2005). The unique role of art making in the treatment of DID. Psychiatric Annals, 35(8).
- Mills, A., Cohen, B. M., & Meneses, J. Z. (1993). Reliability and validity tests of the Diagnostic Drawing Series. The Arts in Psychotherapy, 20 (1), 83–88.

== Selected interviews ==
- Internet: "For the Love of Creativity: The Passionate Pursuit of Self-Taught Artists: A Conversation with Barry M. Cohen, Collector." David Low, National Endowment for the Arts. 1993. http://www.ils.unc.edu/dpr/path/outsiderart/online.html
- Radio: "Multiple Personality Disorder," The Larry King Show. Mutual Broadcasting Network, with Frank W. Putnam and Cornelia B. Wilbur. August 14, 1989.
- Radio: "Drawings and Diagnosis," All Things Considered, National Public Radio, November 1, 1984.
- Journal: "Een nieuwe tekentest (A new diagnostic test) Psychologie, 4, 26-29, Amsterdam, April 1986.
- Journal: “Therapist seeks correlation between diagnosis, drawings”. Carol Turkington, American Psychological Association Monitor, 16(4), 34–36. 1985.

== Selected art exhibitions ==
- "From the Collection of Barry M. Cohen." Show organized by the Folk Art Society of America, Meadow Farm Museum, Glen Allen, VA, 1984.
- Two person show of paintings by Barry M. Cohen and Carrie Wissler Thomas, Art Association of Harrisburg, PA, 1984.
- “Myrrhina” (2000). Cover art, Art Therapy: Journal of the American Art Therapy Association, 17(2).
