= Charles Li Hidley =

American painter

- Born: March 13, 1921; Troy, New York, U.S.
- Died: June 9, 2003 (aged 82)
- Education: Art Students League of New York
- Occupation: Painter

Charles "Li" Hidley (March 13, 1921 – June 9, 2003) was an American painter who studied in New York City at the New York School and created Abstract Expressionist works in Harrisburg, PA from 1966 to the 1990s.

== Life and career ==
Born in Troy, New York, Hidley lost his father during boyhood and was relocated by his mother to NYC in the 1930s. Young Charlie shortened his nickname to "Li" in these years, and was known by that moniker for the rest of his life. He developed a passion for writing science fiction, some of which was published by a science fiction writers' organization when he was a teen.

During World War II he served as an Army Staff Sergeant, stationed in Panama from 1942-45. With the GI Bill he studied at the Art Students League from 1947–49, in Mexico City's Escuela de Pintura y Escultura from 1949–50, at the Brooklyn Museum School of Art, and again at the Art Students League from 1957-60. He worked as a librarian at Cooper Union and as a security guard at the Metropolitan Museum of Art. He was an avid reader of Jungian thought and mythology, themes that are prominent in his paintings.

He relocated to Harrisburg in 1966. In 1971 he had a solo exhibition at the State Museum of Pennsylvania (then the William Penn Museum). He showed in exhibitions at the Pennsylvania Academy of Fine Arts, Cooper Union, the Brooklyn Museum of Art, and elsewhere. At the Art Association of Harrisburg he was an instructor beginning in 1979 and eventually became curator. He died at age 82.

In 2015, a work of Hidley's was included at the State Museum of Pennsylvania in a governor's inaugural exhibition of 55 notable artists over 250 years of Pennsylvania history, including Eakins, Wyeth, and Warhol. That year, Hidley was given a solo exhibition also at the Art Association of Harrisburg.
