= Eric Johnson (defensive tackle) =

American football player (born 1998)

Profile
- Position: Defensive tackle

Personal information
- Born: July 16, 1998 (age 28); Normal, Illinois, U.S.
- Listed height: 6 ft 4 in (1.93 m)
- Listed weight: 299 lb (136 kg)

Career information
- High school: Plainfield South (Plainfield, Illinois)
- College: Missouri State (2016–2021)
- NFL draft: 2022: 5th round, 159th overall pick

Career history
- Indianapolis Colts (2022–2023); New England Patriots (2024); Indianapolis Colts (2025); Minnesota Vikings (2026)*; Atlanta Falcons (2026)*; Green Bay Packers (2026)*; Cleveland Browns (2026)*
- * Offseason or practice squad member only

Awards and highlights
- Second-team All-MVFC (2020)

Career NFL statistics as of 2025
- Total tackles: 41
- Sacks: 1
- Fumble recoveries: 1
- Stats at Pro Football Reference

Eric Morris Johnson II (born July 16, 1998) is an American professional football defensive tackle. He played college football for the Missouri State Bears, and was selected by the Indianapolis Colts in the fifth round of the 2022 NFL draft. He has also played for the New England Patriots.

== Early life ==
Johnson grew up in Normal, Illinois and later moved to Plainfield, Illinois where he attended Plainfield South High School.

== College career ==
Johnson was a member of the Missouri State Bears for six seasons and redshirted his true freshman season. He decided to utilize the extra year of eligibility granted to college athletes who played in the 2020 season due to the COVID-19 pandemic and return to Missouri State for a sixth season. In his final season he was named second-team All-Missouri Valley Football Conference after recording 43 tackles, 6.5 tackles for loss, and 3 blocked kicks.

== Professional career ==
Pre-draft measurables
Height	Weight	Arm length	Hand span	Wingspan	40-yard dash	10-yard split	20-yard split	20-yard shuttle	Three-cone drill	Vertical jump	Broad jump	Bench press
6 ft 4 1/4 in (1.94 m)	300 lb (136 kg)	34 1/4 in (0.87 m)	10 1/8 in (0.26 m)	6 ft 11 1/4 in (2.11 m)	4.87 s	1.70 s	2.91 s	4.66 s	7.58 s	27.5 in (0.70 m)	8 ft 11 in (2.72 m)	20 reps
All values from Pro Day

=== Indianapolis Colts (first stint) ===
Johnson was selected in the fifth round with the 159th overall pick by the Indianapolis Colts in the 2022 NFL draft.

Johnson was waived by the Colts on August 27, 2024.

=== New England Patriots ===
Johnson was claimed off waivers by the New England Patriots on August 28, 2024.

On May 14, 2025, Johnson was waived by the Patriots.

=== Indianapolis Colts (second stint) ===
Johnson was claimed off waivers by the Colts on May 15, 2025. He made 13 appearances for Indianapolis, recording six combined tackles.

=== Minnesota Vikings ===
On April 29, 2026, Johnson signed with the Minnesota Vikings. He was released by the Vikings on August 19.

=== Atlanta Falcons ===
On August 21, 2026, Johnson signed with the Atlanta Falcons. He was released by the Falcons on August 29.

=== Green Bay Packers ===
On September 16, 2026, Johnson signed with the Green Bay Packers' practice squad. On September 28, he was released.

=== Cleveland Browns ===
On October 21, 2026, Johnson signed with the Cleveland Browns practice squad. On November 10, he was released.
