= Ethan Fernea =

American football player (born 1998)

No. 3, 7, 84
- Position: Wide receiver

Personal information
- Born: March 2, 1998 (age 28); Austin, Texas, U.S.
- Listed height: 5 ft 11 in (1.80 m)
- Listed weight: 195 lb (88 kg)

Career information
- High school: Dripping Springs (Dripping Springs, Texas)
- College: UCLA (2018-2021)
- NFL draft: 2022: undrafted

Career history
- Indianapolis Colts (2022–2024)
- Stats at Pro Football Reference

Ethan W. Fernea (born March 2, 1998) is an American former professional football wide receiver. He played college football for the UCLA Bruins before signing with the Indianapolis Colts in 2022.

== Early life and college ==
Fernea was born on March 2, 1998, in Austin, Texas. He attended Dripping Springs High School and was a three-time varsity letter winner in football, where he played on both offense and defense. He earned first-team All-District on both sides of the field and was also a third-team All-CenTex selection. Additionally, he played three seasons of baseball, earning All-District and All-CenTex honors, and three years of track.

After graduating from high school, Fernea was lightly recruited. Although he received a scholarship offer from Air Force, he declined, stating he wanted to play at a higher level. Around Christmas 2015, Fernea's father and uncle visited a friend who was the father of Robbie Paton, a UCLA recruiter. They showed highlights of Fernea to him, and the tape eventually made its way to the UCLA staff, who offered Fernea a chance to make the team as a walk-on.

== College career ==
Fernea made the team at UCLA but was initially buried on the depth chart, only seeing action on special teams. He appeared in one game as a true freshman in 2016 and eight games for the team in 2017, before playing in all 12 games in 2018. He began seeing his first action on offense in 2018 and made two receptions.

Having impressed coach Chip Kelly, Fernea was given a scholarship for the 2019 season, despite having suffered a broken leg during spring camp. He recovered, and in the fall, was given the number 36, a tribute to the late Nick Pasquale, a UCLA football walk-on who died in a 2013 traffic accident. In a game against Colorado, Fernea caught a 45-yard touchdown, the first score of his college career. He finished the season having appeared in all 12 games with two starts (against Colorado and Utah).

In 2020, Fernea's primary position was changed from wide receiver to running back. In a game against rival USC, he recorded a 33-yard receiving touchdown. He finished the shortened season with six games played and one special teams tackle, while having the highest yards-per-catch average on the team for players with more than one reception. Fernea was given an extra year of eligibility due to the COVID-19 pandemic and opted to return to the team in 2021. In his sixth and final season of college football, he played in 11 games, with 10 rushes for 82 yards and one touchdown, which came against USC at the end of a 62–33 blowout win for the Bruins. At the end of the year, he won the Tommy Prothro Award for "excellence on special teams."

== Professional career ==
Pre-draft measurables
Height	Weight	Arm length	Hand span	40-yard dash	10-yard split	20-yard split	20-yard shuttle	Three-cone drill	Vertical jump	Broad jump
5 ft 11 5/8 in (1.82 m)	195 lb (88 kg)	30 in (0.76 m)	9 1/4 in (0.23 m)	4.52 s	1.60 s	2.59 s	4.26 s	7.10 s	34.5 in (0.88 m)	10 ft 1 in (3.07 m)
All values from Pro Day

Despite his relative lack of playing time in college, Fernea was signed by the Indianapolis Colts as an undrafted free agent after going unselected in the 2022 NFL draft. He converted back to wide receiver in training camp, but had an insignificant impact in preseason and was waived during final roster cuts on August 30. However, one day after being released, Fernea was re-signed to the Colts' practice squad. He was activated from the practice squad for the team's Week Seven game against the Tennessee Titans, and made his NFL debut in the 10–19 loss, appearing on 10 combined offense and special teams snaps. He signed a reserve/future contract on January 27, 2023. He was placed on injured reserve on August 5, 2023, and was waived with an injury settlement five days later. He was signed to the practice squad on December 1, 2023. He signed a reserve/future contract on January 8, 2024.

On August 14, 2024, Fernea was waived/injured by the Colts On October 17, he was signed to the practice squad, but released two days later. Fernea was signed to the practice squad on October 23, but released a week later.
