= Rodney Thomas II =

American football player (born 1998)

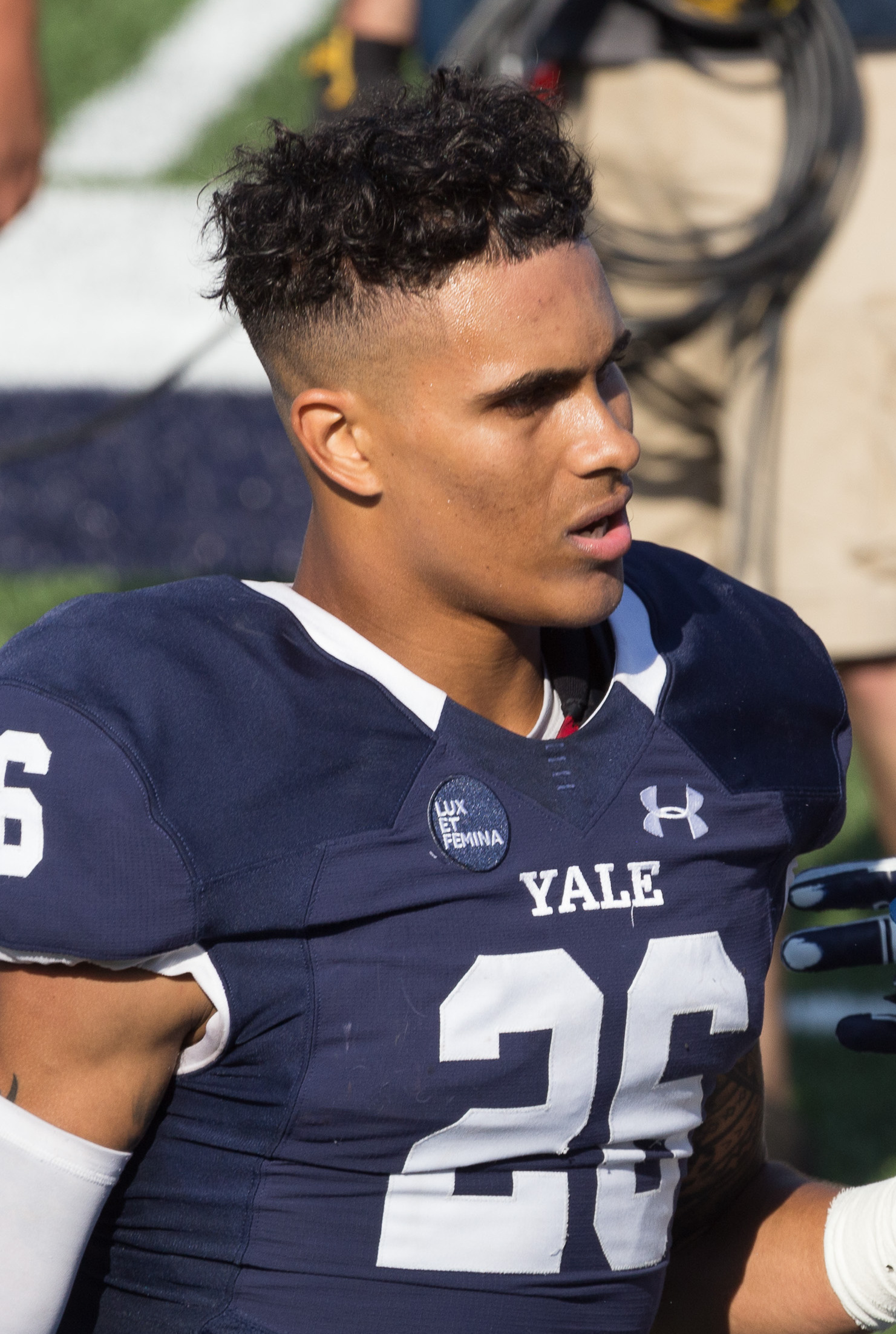
- Thomas with the Yale Bulldogs in 2019

No. 24 – Seattle Seahawks
- Position: Safety
- Roster status: Active

Personal information
- Born: June 26, 1998 (age 28); Pittsburgh, Pennsylvania, U.S.
- Listed height: 6 ft 1 in (1.85 m)
- Listed weight: 196 lb (89 kg)

Career information
- High school: Central Catholic (Pittsburgh, Pennsylvania)
- College: Yale (2017–2021)
- NFL draft: 2022: 7th round, 239th overall pick

Career history
- Indianapolis Colts (2022–2025); Seattle Seahawks (2026–present)

Career NFL statistics as of 2025
- Total tackles: 114
- Pass deflections: 10
- Interceptions: 6
- Stats at Pro Football Reference

Rodney Thomas II (born June 26, 1998) is an American professional football safety for the Seattle Seahawks of the National Football League (NFL). Thomas played four years of college football at Yale.

== Professional career ==
Pre-draft measurables
Height	Weight	Arm length	Hand span	Wingspan	40-yard dash	10-yard split	20-yard split	20-yard shuttle	Three-cone drill	Vertical jump	Broad jump	Bench press
6 ft 1 3/4 in (1.87 m)	196 lb (89 kg)	31 7/8 in (0.81 m)	9 1/4 in (0.23 m)	6 ft 6 3/8 in (1.99 m)	4.51 s	1.56 s	2.50 s	4.02 s	7.02 s	41.0 in (1.04 m)	10 ft 7 in (3.23 m)	13 reps
All values from Pro Day

=== Indianapolis Colts ===
Thomas was drafted by the Indianapolis Colts with the 239th pick in the seventh round of the 2022 NFL draft. In Week 5 of the 2022 season, on Thursday Night Football, Thomas intercepted Denver Broncos quarterback Russell Wilson. He finished his rookie season with 52 tackles, six passes defensed, and four interceptions through 17 games and 10 starts.

Thomas entered the 2023 season as the Colts starting strong safety. He finished the season with 34 tackles, four passes defensed, and two interceptions through 17 games and 15 starts.

=== Seattle Seahawks ===
On March 16, 2026, Thomas signed with the Seattle Seahawks on a one-year contract. Thomas was released by the Seahawks on August 30 as a part of final roster cuts; he was re-signed a day later to be on the team's practice squad. On September 9, Thomas was elevated to the active roster as safety Nick Emmanwori was ruled out for the season opener against the New England Patriots. He was signed to the active roster on September 23.

== NFL career statistics ==
Legend
**Bold**	Career high

=== Regular season ===
Year	Team	Games		Tackles					Interceptions					
Year	Team	GP	GS	Cmb	Solo	Ast	Sck	TFL	Int	Yds	Avg	Lng	TD	PD
2022	IND	16	10	**52**	**34**	**18**	0.0	0	**4**	**51**	**12.8**	**35**	0	**6**
2023	IND	**17**	**15**	34	30	4	0.0	0	2	5	2.5	5	0	4
2024	IND	**17**	1	7	5	2	0.0	0	0	0	0.0	0	0	0
2025	IND	**17**	0	21	14	7	0.0	**1**	0	0	0.0	0	0	0
Career		68	26	114	83	31	0.0	1	6	56	9.3	35	0	10
