= Forrest Rhyne =

American gridiron football player (born 1999)

No. 43, 49
- Position: Linebacker

Personal information
- Born: May 29, 1999 (age 27); Waynesboro, Pennsylvania, U.S.
- Listed height: 6 ft 1 in (1.85 m)
- Listed weight: 233 lb (106 kg)

Career information
- High school: Waynesboro Area (Waynesboro, Pennsylvania)
- College: Villanova
- NFL draft: 2022: undrafted

Career history
- Indianapolis Colts (2022); Pittsburgh Steelers (2023)*; BC Lions (2024)*
- * Offseason or practice squad member only

Awards and highlights
- CAA Defensive Player of the Year (2021); First-team FCS All-American (2021); 3× First-team All-CAA (2019–2021)

Career NFL statistics
- Total tackles: 1
- Stats at Pro Football Reference
- Stats at CFL.ca

Forrest Rhyne (born May 29, 1999) is an American former professional football linebacker. He played college football at Villanova.

== Early life ==
Rhyne grew up in Waynesboro, Pennsylvania and attended Waynesboro Area Senior High School. He was named All-State the Defensive Most Valuable Player of the Mid-Penn Colonial Conference as a junior after making 151 total tackles. Rhyne repeated as an All-State selection as a senior after recording 112 tackles with 21 tackles for loss and 2.5 sacks. He was rated a two-star recruit and committed to play college football at Villanova over offers from Columbia, Holy Cross, Richmond, and Robert Morris.

== College career ==
Rhyne played college football for the Villanova Wildcats for five seasons. He became a starter at linebacker entering his junior season. Rhyne finished the season with 116 tackles, 14.5 tackles for loss, and 6.5 sacks and was named first-team All-Colonial Athletic Conference (CAA). He repeated as a first-team All-CAA selection during his senior season, which was shortened and played in the spring of 2021 due to the COVID-19 pandemic in the United States. Rhyne opted to use the extra year of eligibility granted to college athletes in 2020 due to the COVID-19 pandemic. In his final season, he made 153 tackles with 5.5 tackles for loss, three sacks, and one fumble recovery and was named the CAA Defensive Player of the Year and an FCS All-American. Rhyne finished his college career with 310 tackles, 22.5 tackles for loss, 11.5 sacks, one forced fumble, and one fumble recovery.

== Professional career ==
Pre-draft measurables
Height	Weight	Arm length	Hand span	40-yard dash	10-yard split	20-yard split	20-yard shuttle	Three-cone drill	Vertical jump	Broad jump	Bench press
6 ft 1 3/8 in (1.86 m)	233 lb (106 kg)	30 in (0.76 m)	8 3/8 in (0.21 m)	4.69 s	1.58 s	2.74 s	4.20 s	7.26 s	32.5 in (0.83 m)	9 ft 10 in (3.00 m)	26 reps
All values from Pro Day

=== Indianapolis Colts ===
Rhyne signed with the Indianapolis Colts as an undrafted free agent on May 13, 2022. He was waived during final roster cuts on August 30, but was signed to the team's practice squad the next day. Rhyne was waived on September 27 but was re-signed to the practice squad on October 25. He was elevated to the active roster on November 28, for the team's Week 12 game against the Pittsburgh Steelers and made his NFL debut in the game.

Rhyne signed a reserve/future contract with Indianapolis on January 9, 2023. He was waived by the Colts on May 4.

=== Pittsburgh Steelers ===
On August 13, 2023, Rhyne signed with the Pittsburgh Steelers. On August 26, Rhyne was released by the Steelers.

=== BC Lions ===
On January 9, 2024, Rhyne signed with the BC Lions of the Canadian Football League. On May 24, Rhyne was suspended by the CFL; he was reinstated on May 30. Rhyne was released by the Lions on June 2.
