= Janie Rhyne =

Art therapist

Janie Lee Rhyne (August 14, 1913 – March 1, 1995) was a pioneer in art therapy who used art as expression and communication. She was also a pioneer of Gestalt art therapy, which integrated Gestalt therapy and art therapy. She encouraged clients themselves to interpret and express their feelings and emotions from art works.

== Life and education ==
Rhyne was born in 1913 in Tallahassee, Florida. From her early years, she was very interested in art and people, which guided her academic pursuits. She entered the Florida State University and in 1935 earned a Bachelor of Arts degree with a double major in art and social science. After graduating the university, she learned for herself painting, psychology, homesteading, canning, and people, all of which provided a period of foundation for becoming a therapist.

In 1956, Rhyne received a Master of Arts from FSU in art and cultural anthropology. From 1965 to 1967, she trained at the San Francisco Gestalt institution as a gestalt therapist with Fritz Perls, who was the founder of Gestalt therapy. The training with Perls was most influential for her career, and convinced her that she was a Gestalt therapist who used art and led to her interest in art as therapy. In 1973, she published ‘The Gestalt Art Experience’ based on what she learned of art therapy and Gestalt therapy from Perls.

After she had published her book, she moved to Santa Cruz, California, where she enrolled in doctoral studies in Psychology at the University of California, Santa Cruz. For her dissertation, she designed her own approach of looking at visual expression as a visual construct for establishing a standard for future art therapy research, and in 1979, received a Ph.D.

In her later years, she lived with her daughter, son-in-law, her son, and her three grandchildren. Rhyne died March 1, 1995.

== Career ==
During the early period, Rhyne worked as a designer, painter, and teacher, and also developed the therapeutic aspect of art in work with children and adults in a number of schools and hospitals. She especially worked with children who had emotional problems and paraplegics at a Naval Hospital. After training at the San Francisco Gestalt Institute as a Gestalt therapist, Rhyne went into private practice in San Francisco. She not only focused on working with adults with various psychological symptoms or pathological problems such as dementia, but also began to be interested in hippies on drugs and spent much time working with them. After receiving her Ph.D, Rhyne began to teach courses annually at several art therapy programs at a variety of universities: Vermont College of Norwich University, the University of Iowa, Antioch, Goddard, Union Graduate School, the University of Louisville, and the British Columbia School of Art. In addition, she emphasized the importance of art therapy research and spent much time on establishing a standard for future research.

Rhyne was also active in the work of American Art Therapy Association. She served for two years as chair of the Professional Standards and Registration Committee and for another two years as Chair of the Research Committee. In addition, she served as the consultant to the Education and Training Board for yet another two-year term. In 1980, she was awarded the association's most prestigious award, an Honorary Life Member.

== Media ==
Rhyne used a wide variety of conventional and non-conventional art materials to encourage clients to express their feelings and experiences. However, she generally preferred to choose drawing and painting for effective therapy since she believed that drawing and painting have many clues that the principles of gestalt perception become easily comprehensible. The gestalt theories of perception claim that human beings tend to identify similar shapes, lines, and colors as belonging together, so people perceive them as creating a visual group and then form a figure that stands out in awareness from a less figural background. Similarly, when people represent imagery with graphic media, they naturally create figures and backgrounds. Then, they tend to recognize their own tendency toward completing wholes and effecting closure of unfinished parts of wholes.

With these principles, Rhyne was convinced that clients can gain insight into how they generally perceive in the art experiences. In other words, she believed that how people perceive visually is likely to be directly related to how they think and feel. For example, the way people use lines, shapes, and colors in relationship to each other may indicate something about their patterns in life. Also, the structure, or the lack of it, in a client's drawing or painting may be related to client behavior in living situations.

== Contributions ==
Rhyne integrated the principles of Gestalt approach with art therapy. The Gestalt approach emphasized that individuals must holistically be understood in the context of their ongoing relationship with the environment. They also claimed that the cause of distressing individuals is that individuals do not integrate the fragmented parts of their personality at the present, due to unfinished business from the past or the lack of being aware of the environment and themselves. Thus, the center goal of Gestalt art therapy is to help clients ultimately experience the integration of their fragmented parts of personality at the present through experiencing art work. She claimed that the most important aspect of the therapist's task in the Gestalt art experience is his or her skill in transferring the insights of the entire process onto way one experiences one's life and relationship.

Rhyne believed that the most effective way for the gestalt therapy was in the activity of art therapy because she was convinced that artistic media served as a bridge between the internal and external worlds. She emphasized creating the gestalt art experience by having clients involved in an art activity. She thought that Gestalt art experience can help people effectively activate their sensory memories. Her gestalt art experience gave guidelines for the use of art materials to explore one's own individually unique qualities, stimulates expanding one's range of perception through the creation of forms with art materials, and helps people learn to understand the visual messages forms convey. Her focus on gestalt art experience contributed to broaden an understanding of methodology of art therapy.

Rhyne encouraged clients themselves to interpret and express their feelings and emotions from artworks they created. Thus, it contributed to the therapeutic approach in art therapy that includes the client doing the interpreting with the assistance of therapist. It was directly opposite to the conventional psychotherapy approach, which followed a more formal structure, and where the interpretations are made by art therapists.

== Books published ==
- Gestalt Art Experience, Chicago, IL: Magnolia Street Publishers, 1973/1996
- The Gestalt Art Experience: Patterns that connect, Chicago, IL: Magnolia Street Publishers, 1984
- The Gestalt Art Experience: Creative process & expressive therapy, Chicago, IL: Magnolia Street Publishers, 1984
