= 2021 Indianapolis Colts season =

69th season in franchise history

- Owner: Jim Irsay
- General manager: Chris Ballard
- Head coach: Frank Reich
- Home stadium: Lucas Oil Stadium

Results
- Record: 9–8
- Division place: 2nd AFC South
- Playoffs: Did not qualify
- All-Pros: 5: RB Jonathan Taylor (1st team); LB Shaquille Leonard (1st team); LS Luke Rhodes (1st team); LG Quenton Nelson (2nd team); ST Ashton Dulin (2nd team)
- Pro Bowlers: 7: RB Jonathan Taylor; G Quenton Nelson; C Ryan Kelly; DT DeForest Buckner; MLB Shaquille Leonard; CB Kenny Moore II; LS Luke Rhodes

Uniform
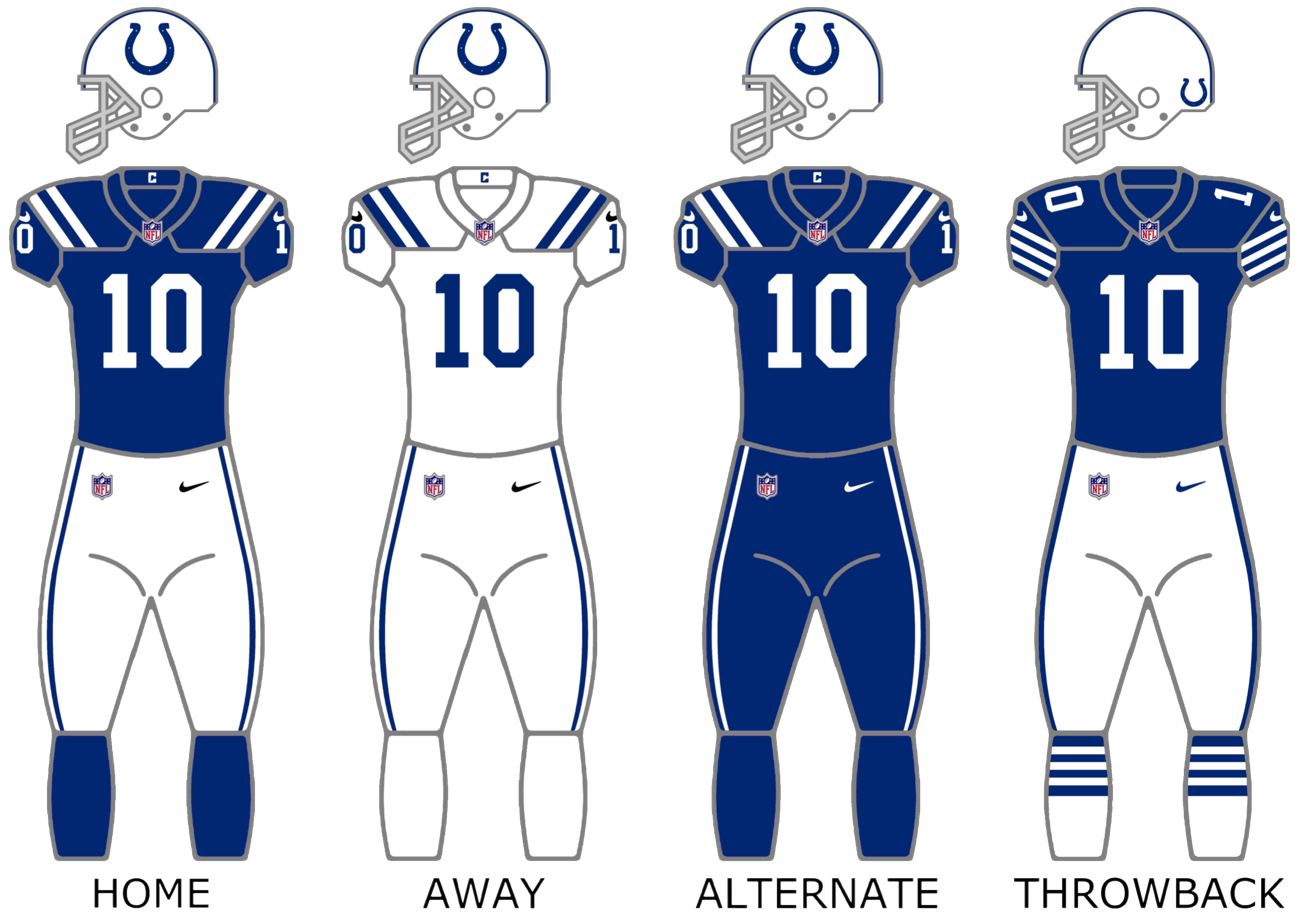

The 2021 season was the Indianapolis Colts' 69th season in the National Football League (NFL), their 38th in Indianapolis, and their 14th playing their home games at Lucas Oil Stadium. It was their fourth season under head coach Frank Reich and fifth under the leadership of general manager Chris Ballard. Despite having 7 Pro Bowlers and 5 AP All-Pros, the Colts failed to improve upon their 11–5 record from the previous season. The Colts were eliminated from the postseason in the final week of the season after a stunning loss to the 2–14 Jacksonville Jaguars and the Pittsburgh Steelers beating the Baltimore Ravens the same day.

== Draft ==
2021 Indianapolis Colts Draft
Round	Selection	Player	Position	College
1	21	Kwity Paye	DE	Michigan
2	54	Dayo Odeyingbo	DE	Vanderbilt
4	127	Kylen Granson	TE	SMU
5	165	Shawn Davis	S	Florida
6	206	Sam Ehlinger	QB	Texas
7	229	Mike Strachan	WR	Charleston
7	248	Will Fries	OG	Penn State

Pre-draft trades

- The Colts traded their 3rd-round pick in 2021 along with a conditional 2nd-round pick in 2022 to the Philadelphia Eagles for quarterback Carson Wentz.

== Staff ==
2021 Indianapolis Colts staff
Front office: Owner – Jim Irsay; Vice chairwoman/co-owner – Carlie Irsay-Gordon; Vice chairwoman/co-owner – Casey Foyt; Vice chairwoman/co-owner – Kalen Jackson; General manager – Chris Ballard; Assistant general manager – Ed Dodds; Director of player personnel – Kevin Rogers Jr.; Director of football administration – Mike Bluem; Director of college scouting – Morocco Brown; Director of pro scouting – Jon Shaw; Assistant director of college scouting – Matt Tarpening; Senior player personnel scout – Todd Vasvari; Area scout - Jamie Moore; Director of player development – Brian Decker; Head coaches: Head coach – Frank Reich; Offensive coaches: Offensive coordinator – Marcus Brady; Quarterbacks – Scott Milanovich; Assistant quarterbacks – Parks Frazier; Running backs – Scottie Montgomery; Wide receivers – Mike Groh; Tight ends – Klayton Adams; Offensive line – Chris Strausser; Assistant offensive line – Kevin Mawae; Senior offensive assistant – Press Taylor; Offensive quality control – Jerrod Johnson	Defensive coaches: Defensive coordinator – Matt Eberflus; Defensive line – Brian Baker; Special defensive assistant/asst. defensive line – Matt Raich; Linebackers – Dave Borgonzi; Defensive backs/cornerbacks – James Rowe; Defensive backs/safeties – Alan Williams; Assistant defensive backs – David Overstreet II; Special teams coaches: Special teams coordinator – Raymond Ventrone; Assistant special teams – Joe Hastings; Strength and conditioning: Director of sports performance – Rusty Jones; Head strength and conditioning – Richard Howell; Applied sports science/conditioning – Doug McKenney; Assistant strength and conditioning – Zane Fakes

== Final roster ==
2021 Indianapolis Colts roster
Quarterbacks (QB): 4 Sam Ehlinger; 2 Carson Wentz; Running backs (RB): 21 Nyheim Hines; 35 Deon Jackson; 25 Marlon Mack; 28 Jonathan Taylor; Wide receivers (WR): 1 Parris Campbell; 16 Ashton Dulin; 13 T. Y. Hilton; 14 Zach Pascal; 10 Dezmon Patmon; 11 Michael Pittman Jr.; 17 Mike Strachan; Tight ends (TE): 81 Mo Alie-Cox; 84 Jack Doyle; 83 Kylen Granson	Offensive linemen (OL): 73 Julién Davenport T; 79 Eric Fisher T; 75 Will Fries G; 64 Mark Glowinski G; 78 Ryan Kelly C; 56 Quenton Nelson G; 63 Danny Pinter C; 69 Matt Pryor T/G; 62 Chris Reed G; 72 Braden Smith T; Defensive linemen (DL): 52 Ben Banogu DE; 99 DeForest Buckner DT; 97 Al-Quadin Muhammad DE; 54 Dayo Odeyingbo DE; 51 Kwity Paye DE; 91 Isaac Rochell DE/DT; 76 Taylor Stallworth DT; 90 Grover Stewart DT; 57 Kemoko Turay DE	Linebackers (LB): 49 Matthew Adams OLB; 44 Zaire Franklin OLB/MLB; 59 Jordan Glasgow OLB; 53 Shaquille Leonard OLB; 58 Bobby Okereke MLB; 45 E. J. Speed OLB; Defensive backs (DB): 41 Jahleel Addae SS; 38 T. J. Carrie CB; 23 Kenny Moore CB; 30 George Odum FS/SS; 27 Xavier Rhodes CB; 34 Isaiah Rodgers CB; 37 Khari Willis SS; 26 Rock Ya-Sin CB; Special teams (ST): 3 Michael Badgley K; 46 Luke Rhodes LS; 8 Rigoberto Sanchez P	Practice squad: 33 Ibraheim Campbell SS (PS/I); 47 Anthony Chesley CB; 92 Kameron Cline DE; 76 Shon Coleman T; 15 Keke Coutee WR; 41 Farrod Green TE; 12 DeMichael Harris WR; 5 Brett Hundley QB; 80 Michael Jacobson TE; 9 James Morgan QB; 61 Carter O'Donnell T; 33 Brian Poole CB; 29 Will Redmond SS; 36 D. J. Swearinger SS; 39 Marvell Tell CB (PS/I); 40 Chris Wilcox CB; 66 Chris Williams DT; 85 Eli Wolf TE; Reserve: 32 Julian Blackmon FS (IR); 3 Rodrigo Blankenship K (IR); 6 Quartney Davis WR (IR); 94 Tyquan Lewis DE/DT (IR); 55 Skai Moore MLB (IR); 48 Nick Nelson CB (IR); 42 Andrew Sendejo (COVID-19) FS/SS; 71 Sam Tevi T (IR); 93 Robert Windsor DT (IR); 96 Antwaun Woods DT (IR); Rookies in italics 52 active, 10 reserve, 16 practice squad (2 exempt)

== Preseason ==
The Colts' preseason opponents and results are mentioned as below:

Week	Date	Opponent	Result	Record	Venue	Recap
1	August 15	Carolina Panthers	W 21–18	1–0	Lucas Oil Stadium	Recap
2	August 21	at Minnesota Vikings	W 12–10	2–0	U.S. Bank Stadium	Recap
3	August 27	at Detroit Lions	W 27–17	3–0	Ford Field	Recap

== Regular season ==
=== Schedule ===
The Colts' 2021 schedule was announced on May 12.

Week	Date	Opponent	Result	Record	Venue	Recap
1	September 12	Seattle Seahawks	**L** 16–28	0–1	Lucas Oil Stadium	Recap
2	September 19	Los Angeles Rams	**L** 24–27	0–2	Lucas Oil Stadium	Recap
3	September 26	at **Tennessee Titans**	**L** 16–25	0–3	Nissan Stadium	Recap
4	October 3	at Miami Dolphins	**W** 27–17	1–3	Hard Rock Stadium	Recap
5	October 11	at Baltimore Ravens	**L** 25–31 (OT)	1–4	M&T Bank Stadium	Recap
6	October 17	**Houston Texans**	**W** 31–3	2–4	Lucas Oil Stadium	Recap
7	October 24	at San Francisco 49ers	**W** 30–18	3–4	Levi's Stadium	Recap
8	October 31	**Tennessee Titans**	**L** 31–34 (OT)	3–5	Lucas Oil Stadium	Recap
9	November 4	New York Jets	**W** 45–30	4–5	Lucas Oil Stadium	Recap
10	November 14	**Jacksonville Jaguars**	**W** 23–17	5–5	Lucas Oil Stadium	Recap
11	November 21	at Buffalo Bills	**W** 41–15	6–5	Highmark Stadium	Recap
12	November 28	Tampa Bay Buccaneers	**L** 31–38	6–6	Lucas Oil Stadium	Recap
13	December 5	at **Houston Texans**	**W** 31–0	7–6	NRG Stadium	Recap
14	Bye					
15	December 18	New England Patriots	**W** 27–17	8–6	Lucas Oil Stadium	Recap
16	December 25	at Arizona Cardinals	**W** 22–16	9–6	State Farm Stadium	Recap
17	January 2	Las Vegas Raiders	**L** 20–23	9–7	Lucas Oil Stadium	Recap
18	January 9	at **Jacksonville Jaguars**	**L** 11–26	9–8	TIAA Bank Field	Recap

Note: Intra-division opponents are in bold text.

=== Game summaries ===
==== Week 1: vs. Seattle Seahawks ====
Week 1: Seattle Seahawks at Indianapolis Colts – Game summary

Quarter	1	2	3	4	Total
**Seahawks**	7	14	0	7	**28**
Colts	3	7	0	6	**16**

at Lucas Oil Stadium, Indianapolis, Indiana

- Date: September 12
- Game time: 1:00 p.m. EDT
- Game weather: None (retractable roof closed)
- Game attendance: 63,347
- Referee: Tony Corrente
- TV announcers (Fox): Kenny Albert, Jonathan Vilma and Sara Walsh
- Recap, Game Book

Game information

**First quarter**

- IND – Rodrigo Blankenship 21-yard field goal, 5:41. Colts 3–0. **Drive: 14 plays, 72 yards, 9:19.**
- SEA – Tyler Lockett 23-yard pass from Russell Wilson (Jason Myers kick), 1:26. Seahawks 7–3. **Drive: 9 plays, 81 yards, 4:15.**

**Second quarter**

- SEA – Gerald Everett 9-yard pass from Russell Wilson (Jason Myers kick), 11:22. Seahawks 14–3. **Drive: 7 plays, 61 yards, 3:28.**
- IND – Zach Pascal 10-yard pass from Carson Wentz (Rodrigo Blankenship kick), 7:04. Seahawks 14–10. **Drive: 7 plays, 68 yards, 4:18.**
- SEA – Tyler Lockett 69-yard pass from Russell Wilson (Jason Myers kick), 0:41. Seahawks 21–10. **Drive: 6 plays, 83 yards, 2:19.**

**Third quarter**

- No scoring plays.

**Fourth quarter**

- SEA – DK Metcalf 15-yard pass from Russell Wilson (Jason Myers kick), 6:41. Seahawks 28–10. **Drive: 7 plays, 73 yards, 3:15.**
- IND – Zach Pascal 11-yard pass from Carson Wentz (run failed), 7:04. Seahawks 28–16. **Drive: 10 plays, 75 yards, 4:33.**

**Top passers**

- SEA – Russell Wilson – 18/23, 254 yards, 4 TD
- IND – Carson Wentz – 25/38, 251 yards, 2 TD

**Top rushers**

- SEA – Chris Carson – 16 rushes, 91 yards
- IND – Jonathan Taylor – 17 rushes, 56 yards

**Top receivers**

- SEA – Tyler Lockett – 4 receptions, 100 yards, 2 TD
- IND – Jonathan Taylor – 6 receptions, 60 yards

With their 8th straight season-opening defeat, the Colts started 0–1.

==== Week 2: vs. Los Angeles Rams ====
Week 2: Los Angeles Rams at Indianapolis Colts – Game summary

Quarter	1	2	3	4	Total
**Rams**	7	3	7	10	**27**
Colts	0	6	8	10	**24**

at Lucas Oil Stadium, Indianapolis, Indiana

- Date: September 19
- Game time: 1:00 p.m. EDT
- Game weather: None (retractable roof closed)
- Game attendance: 63,076
- Referee: Shawn Smith
- TV announcers (Fox): Kenny Albert, Jonathan Vilma and Lindsay Czarniak
- Recap, Game Book

Game information

**First quarter**

- LAR – Cooper Kupp 16-yard pass from Matthew Stafford (Matt Gay kick), 3:18. Rams 7–0. **Drive: 8 plays, 90 yards, 4:55.**

**Second quarter**

- IND – Rodrigo Blankenship 48-yard field goal, 14:52. Rams 7–3. **Drive: 7 plays, 45 yards, 3:56.**
- LAR – Matt Gay 34-yard field goal, 1:51. Rams 10–3. **Drive: 16 plays, 79 yards, 8:18.**
- IND – Rodrigo Blankenship 46-yard field goal, 0:00. Rams 10–6. **Drive: 10 plays, 47 yards, 1:51.**

**Third quarter**

- LAR – Darrell Henderson 2-yard run (Matt Gay kick), 11:36. Rams 17–6. **Drive: 7 plays, 74 yards, 3:24.**
- IND – Zach Pascal 8-yard pass from Carson Wentz (Carson Wentz–Jack Doyle pass), 3:43. Rams 17–14. **Drive: 11 plays, 74 yards, 5:38.**

**Fourth quarter**

- IND – Ashton Dulin fumble recovery in end zone (Rodrigo Blankenship kick), 14:12. Colts 21–17.
- LAR – Cooper Kupp 10-yard pass from Matthew Stafford (Matt Gay kick), 12:09. Rams 24–21. **Drive: 4 plays, 70 yards, 2:03.**
- IND – Rodrigo Blankenship 35-yard field goal, 7:22. Tied 24–24. **Drive: 9 plays, 58 yards, 4:47.**
- LAR – Matt Gay 38-yard field goal, 2:23. Rams 27–24. **Drive: 12 plays, 55 yards, 4:59.**

**Top passers**

- LAR – Matthew Stafford – 19/30, 278 yards, 2 TD, INT
- IND – Carson Wentz – 20/31, 247 yards, TD, INT

**Top rushers**

- LAR – Darrell Henderson – 13 rushes, 53 yards, TD
- IND – Jonathan Taylor – 15 rushes, 51 yards

**Top receivers**

- LAR – Cooper Kupp – 9 receptions, 163 yards, 2 TD
- IND – Michael Pittman Jr. – 8 receptions, 123 yards

With the loss, the Colts started 0–2 for the first time since 2017.

==== Week 3: at Tennessee Titans ====
Week 3: Indianapolis Colts at Tennessee Titans – Game summary

Quarter	1	2	3	4	Total
Colts	0	10	3	3	**16**
**Titans**	7	7	0	11	**25**

at Nissan Stadium, Nashville, Tennessee

- Date: September 26
- Game time: 1:00 p.m. EDT/12:00 p.m. CDT
- Game weather: Sunny, 72 °F (22 °C)
- Game attendance: 67,914
- Referee: Bill Vinovich
- TV announcers (CBS): Andrew Catalon, James Lofton and Michael Grady
- Recap, Game Book

Game information

**First quarter**

- TEN – Chester Rogers 6-yard pass from Ryan Tannehill (Randy Bullock kick), 6:34. Titans 7–0. **Drive: 11 plays, 71 yards, 5:34.**

**Second quarter**

- IND – Nyheim Hines 9-yard run (Rodrigo Blankenship kick), 10:19. Tied 7–7. **Drive: 9 plays, 53 yards, 4:52.**
- TEN – Nick Westbrook-Ikhine 18-yard pass from Ryan Tannehill (Randy Bullock kick), 5:56. Titans 14–7. **Drive: 8 plays, 75 yards, 4:23.**
- IND – Rodrigo Blankenship 43-yard field goal, 0:00. Titans 14–10. **Drive: 4 plays, 22 yards, 0:49.**

**Third quarter**

- IND – Rodrigo Blankenship 28-yard field goal, 6:26. Titans 14–13. **Drive: 17 plays, 66 yards, 8:34.**

**Fourth quarter**

- TEN – Jeremy McNichols 10-yard pass from Ryan Tannehill (Derrick Henry run), 12:56. Titans 22–13. **Drive: 5 plays, 59 yards, 2:24.**
- IND – Rodrigo Blankenship 24-yard field goal, 10:20. Titans 22–16. **Drive: 7 plays, 70 yards, 2:36.**
- TEN – Randy Bullock 32-yard field goal, 2:58. Titans 25–16. **Drive: 14 plays, 67 yards, 7:22.**

**Top passers**

- IND – Carson Wentz – 19/37, 194 yards
- TEN – Ryan Tannehill – 18/27, 197 yards, 3 TD, 2 INT

**Top rushers**

- IND – Jonathan Taylor – 10 rushes, 64 yards
- TEN – Derrick Henry – 28 rushes, 113 yards

**Top receivers**

- IND – Michael Pittman Jr. – 6 receptions, 68 yards
- TEN – Nick Westbrook-Ikhine – 4 receptions, 53 yards, TD

With this loss, the Colts started 0–3 for the first time since 2011.

==== Week 4: at Miami Dolphins ====
Week 4: Indianapolis Colts at Miami Dolphins – Game summary

Quarter	1	2	3	4	Total
**Colts**	0	7	10	10	**27**
Dolphins	3	0	0	14	**17**

at Hard Rock Stadium, Miami Gardens, Florida

- Date: October 3
- Game time: 1:00 p.m. EDT
- Game weather: Partly cloudy, 85 °F (29 °C)
- Game attendance: 64,571
- Referee: Alex Kemp
- TV announcers (CBS): Spero Dedes and Jay Feely
- Recap, Game Book

Game information

**First quarter**

- MIA – Jason Sanders 38-yard field goal, 9:54. Dolphins 3–0. **Drive: 4 plays, 7 yards, 1:18.**

**Second quarter**

- IND – Jonathan Taylor 23-yard run (Rodrigo Blankenship kick), 2:47. Colts 7–3. **Drive: 10 plays, 80 yards, 5:14.**

**Third quarter**

- IND – Mo Alie-Cox 3-yard pass from Carson Wentz (Rodrigo Blankenship kick), 8:29. Colts 14–3. **Drive: 11 plays, 84 yards, 6:31.**
- IND – Rodrigo Blankenship 34-yard field goal, 0:54. Colts 17–3. **Drive: 4 plays, 2 yards, 2:56.**

**Fourth quarter**

- IND – Rodrigo Blankenship 43-yard field goal, 13:17. Colts 20–3. **Drive: 4 plays, 5 yards, 1:30.**
- MIA – Mike Gesicki 1-yard pass from Jacoby Brissett (Jason Sanders kick), 10:40. Colts 20–10. **Drive: 8 plays, 75 yards, 2:37.**
- IND – Mo Alie-Cox 11-yard pass from Carson Wentz (Rodrigo Blankenship kick), 6:15. Colts 27–10. **Drive: 8 plays, 60 yards, 4:25.**
- MIA – DeVante Parker 3-yard pass from Jacoby Brissett (Jason Sanders kick), 4:24. Colts 27–17. **Drive: 6 plays, 75 yards, 1:51.**

**Top passers**

- IND – Carson Wentz – 24/32, 228 yards, 2 TD
- MIA – Jacoby Brissett – 20/30, 199 yards, 2 TD

**Top rushers**

- IND – Jonathan Taylor – 16 rushes, 103 yards, TD
- MIA – Malcolm Brown – 8 rushes, 23 yards

**Top receivers**

- IND – Michael Pittman Jr. – 6 receptions, 95 yards
- MIA – DeVante Parker – 4 receptions, 77 yards, TD

With their first win of the season, the Colts improved to 1–3.

==== Week 5: at Baltimore Ravens ====
Week 5: Indianapolis Colts at Baltimore Ravens – Game summary

Quarter	1	2	3	4	OT	Total
Colts	7	3	12	3	0	**25**
**Ravens**	0	3	6	16	6	**31**

at M&T Bank Stadium, Baltimore, Maryland

- Date: October 11
- Game time: 8:15 p.m. EDT
- Game weather: Cloudy, 69 °F (21 °C)
- Game attendance: 70,510
- Referee: Land Clark
- TV announcers (ESPN): Steve Levy, Brian Griese, Louis Riddick and Lisa Salters
- Recap, Game Book

Game information

**First quarter**

- IND – Jonathan Taylor 76-yard pass from Carson Wentz (Rodrigo Blankenship kick), 12:59. Colts 7–0. **Drive: 3 plays, 71 yards, 0:23.**

**Second quarter**

- BAL – Justin Tucker 23-yard field goal, 1:36. Colts 7–3. **Drive: 9 plays, 80 yards, 2:49.**
- IND – Rodrigo Blankenship 37-yard field goal, 0:00. Colts 10–3. **Drive: 8 plays, 56 yards, 1:36.**

**Third quarter**

- IND – Michael Pittman Jr. 42-yard pass from Carson Wentz (kick failed), 13:59. Colts 16–3. **Drive: 2 plays, 73 yards, 1:01.**
- IND – Jonathan Taylor 4-yard run (pass failed), 3:06. Colts 22–3. **Drive: 6 plays, 81 yards, 3:36.**
- BAL – Marquise Brown 43-yard pass from Lamar Jackson (run failed), 0:56. Colts 22–9. **Drive: 5 plays, 75 yards, 2:10.**

**Fourth quarter**

- IND – Rodrigo Blankenship 43-yard field goal, 12:00. Colts 25–9. **Drive: 9 plays, 55 yards, 3:56.**
- BAL – Mark Andrews 5-yard pass from Lamar Jackson (Lamar Jackson–Mark Andrews pass), 9:38. Colts 25–17. **Drive: 6 plays, 78 yards, 2:22.**
- BAL – Mark Andrews 4-yard pass from Lamar Jackson (Lamar Jackson–Mark Andrews pass), 0:39. Tied 25–25. **Drive: 11 plays, 75 yards, 3:50.**

**Overtime**

- BAL – Marquise Brown 5-yard pass from Lamar Jackson, 5:24. Ravens 31–25. **Drive: 10 plays, 68 yards, 4:36.**

**Top passers**

- IND – Carson Wentz – 25/35, 402 yards, 2 TD
- BAL – Lamar Jackson – 37/43, 442 yards, 4 TD

**Top rushers**

- IND – Jonathan Taylor – 15 rushes, 53 yards, TD
- BAL – Lamar Jackson – 14 rushes, 62 yards

**Top receivers**

- IND – Jonathan Taylor – 3 receptions, 116 yards, TD
- BAL – Mark Andrews – 11 receptions, 147 yards, 2 TD

Despite leading by as many as 19 points late in the third quarter and by 16 points midway through the fourth quarter, the Colts collapsed and were defeated in overtime after allowing 3 consecutive touchdown drives. With the heartbreaking loss, the Colts fell to 1–4.

==== Week 6: vs. Houston Texans ====
Week 6: Houston Texans at Indianapolis Colts – Game summary

Quarter	1	2	3	4	Total
Texans	0	3	0	0	**3**
**Colts**	7	3	14	7	**31**

at Lucas Oil Stadium, Indianapolis, Indiana

- Date: October 17
- Game time: 1:00 p.m. EDT
- Game weather: Sunny, 58 °F (14 °C) (retractable roof open)
- Game attendance: 57,947
- Referee: Jerome Boger
- TV announcers (CBS): Spero Dedes and Jay Feely
- Recap, Game Book

Game information

**First quarter**

- IND – Parris Campbell 51-yard pass from Carson Wentz (Michael Badgley kick), 1:52. Colts 7–0. **Drive: 7 plays, 92 yards, 3:18.**

**Second quarter**

- IND – Michael Badgley 41-yard field goal, 12:59. Colts 10–0. **Drive: 6 plays, 59 yards, 1:56.**
- HOU – Kaʻimi Fairbairn 31-yard field goal, 6:16. Colts 10–3. **Drive: 13 plays, 62 yards, 6:43.**

**Third quarter**

- IND – Mo Alie-Cox 28-yard pass from Carson Wentz (Michael Badgley kick), 11:50. Colts 17–3. **Drive: 2 plays, 28 yards, 0:46.**
- IND – Jonathan Taylor 4-yard run (Michael Badgley kick), 6:37. Colts 24–3. **Drive: 4 plays, 88 yards, 2:16.**

**Fourth quarter**

- IND – Jonathan Taylor 11-yard run (Michael Badgley kick), 4:47. Colts 31–3. **Drive: 9 plays, 63 yards, 5:21.**

**Top passers**

- HOU – Davis Mills – 29/43, 243 yards, 2 INT
- IND – Carson Wentz – 11/20, 223 yards, 2 TD

**Top rushers**

- HOU – Mark Ingram II – 18 rushes, 73 yards
- IND – Jonathan Taylor – 14 rushes, 145 yards, 2 TD

**Top receivers**

- HOU – Brandin Cooks – 9 receptions, 89 yards
- IND – T. Y. Hilton – 4 receptions, 80 yards

The Colts recorded their third consecutive win over the Texans, and improved to 2–4.

==== Week 7: at San Francisco 49ers ====
Week 7: Indianapolis Colts at San Francisco 49ers – Game summary

Quarter	1	2	3	4	Total
**Colts**	7	6	7	10	**30**
49ers	12	0	0	6	**18**

at Levi's Stadium, Santa Clara, California

- Date: October 24
- Game time: 8:20 p.m. EDT/5:20 p.m. PDT
- Game weather: Cloudy, rainy, 64 °F (18 °C)
- Game attendance: 56,576
- Referee: Craig Wrolstad
- TV announcers (NBC): Al Michaels, Cris Collinsworth and Michele Tafoya
- Recap, Game Book

Game information

**First quarter**

- SF – Elijah Mitchell 14-yard run (kick failed, wide right), 10:12. 49ers 6–0. **Drive: 8 plays, 78 yards, 4:48.**
- SF – Joey Slye 34-yard field goal, 8:08. 49ers 9–0. **Drive: 5 plays, 12 yards, 1:44.**
- IND – Mo Alie-Cox 11-yard pass from Carson Wentz (Michael Badgley kick), 5:15. 49ers 9–7. **Drive: 6 plays, 75 yards, 2:53.**
- SF – Joey Slye 56-yard field goal, 2:27. 49ers 12–7. **Drive: 6 plays, 39 yards, 2:48.**

**Second quarter**

- IND – Carson Wentz 1-yard run (pass failed) 1:00. Colts 13–12. **Drive: 5 plays, 28 yards, 2:02.**

**Third quarter**

- IND – Jonathan Taylor 5-yard run (Michael Badgley kick), 3:45. Colts 20–12. **Drive: 1 play, 33 yards, 0:53.**

**Fourth quarter**

- SF – Deebo Samuel 14-yard pass from Jimmy Garoppolo (pass failed), 13:07. Colts 20–18. **Drive: 3 plays, 70 yards, 1:11.**
- IND – Michael Badgley 42-yard field goal, 7:00. Colts 23–18. **Drive: 10 plays, 49 yards, 6:07.**
- IND – Michael Pittman Jr. 28-yard pass from Carson Wentz (Michael Badgley kick), 2:49. Colts 30–18. **Drive: 6 plays, 39 yards, 2:31.**

**Top passers**

- IND – Carson Wentz – 17/26, 150 yards, 2 TD
- SF – Jimmy Garoppolo – 16/27, 181 yards, TD, 2 INT

**Top rushers**

- IND – Jonathan Taylor – 18 rushes, 107 yards, TD
- SF – Elijah Mitchell – 18 rushes, 107 yards, TD

**Top receivers**

- IND – Michael Pittman Jr. – 4 receptions, 105 yards, TD
- SF – Deebo Samuel – 7 receptions, 100 yards, TD

The Colts dominated the 49ers on the road. Carson Wentz scored 3 total touchdowns and the defense forced four turnovers against the 49ers' offense. With the win, the Colts improved to 3–4.

==== Week 8: vs. Tennessee Titans ====
Week 8: Tennessee Titans at Indianapolis Colts – Game summary

Quarter	1	2	3	4	OT	Total
**Titans**	0	14	7	10	3	**34**
Colts	14	3	7	7	0	**31**

at Lucas Oil Stadium, Indianapolis, Indiana

- Date: October 31
- Game time: 1:00 p.m. EDT
- Game weather: Sunny, 56 °F (13 °C) (retractable roof open)
- Game attendance: 59,175
- Referee: Carl Cheffers
- TV announcers (CBS): Spero Dedes and Jay Feely
- Recap, Game Book

Game information

**First quarter**

- IND – Michael Pittman Jr. 2-yard pass from Carson Wentz (Michael Badgley kick), 8:41. Colts 7–0. **Drive: 14 plays, 82 yards, 6:19.**
- IND – Michael Pittman Jr. 7-yard pass from Carson Wentz (Michael Badgley kick), 7:44. Colts 14–0. **Drive: 1 play, 7 yards, 0:05.**

**Second quarter**

- TEN – Geoff Swaim 6-yard pass from Ryan Tannehill (Randy Bullock kick), 12:07. Colts 14–7. **Drive: 11 plays, 60 yards, 5:48.**
- TEN – A. J. Brown 57-yard pass from Ryan Tannehill (Randy Bullock kick), 4:13. Tied 14–14. **Drive: 1 play, 57 yards, 0:11.**
- IND – Michael Badgley 34-yard field goal, 0:00. Colts 17–14. **Drive: 13 plays, 59 yards, 4:13.**

**Third quarter**

- TEN – Nick Westbrook-Ikhine 5-yard pass from Ryan Tannehill (Randy Bullock kick), 7:42. Titans 21–17. **Drive: 14 plays, 75 yards, 7:18.**
- IND – Jack Doyle 5-yard pass from Carson Wentz (Michael Badgley kick), 1:21. Colts 24–21. **Drive: 4 plays, 57 yards, 2:21.**

**Fourth quarter**

- TEN – Randy Bullock 46-yard field goal, 11:15. Tied 24–24. **Drive: 10 plays, 47 yards, 5:06.**
- TEN – Elijah Molden 2-yard interception return (Randy Bullock kick), 1:26. Titans 31–24.
- IND – Jonathan Taylor 1-yard run (Michael Badgley kick), 0:22. Tied 31–31. **Drive: 5 plays, 75 yards, 1:04.**

**Overtime**

- TEN – Randy Bullock 44-yard field goal, 4:03. Titans 34–31. **Drive: 4 plays, 5 yards, 1:45.**

**Top passers**

- TEN – Ryan Tannehill – 23/33, 265 yards, 3 TD, 2 INT
- IND – Carson Wentz – 27/51, 231 yards, 3 TD, 2 INT

**Top rushers**

- TEN – Derrick Henry – 28 rushes, 68 yards
- IND – Jonathan Taylor – 16 rushes, 70 yards, TD

**Top receivers**

- TEN – A.J. Brown – 10 receptions, 155 yards, TD
- IND – Michael Pittman Jr. – 10 receptions, 86 yards, 2 TD

The Colts blew another large lead and were defeated by the Titans in overtime after two costly interceptions from Wentz. With the loss, the Colts fell to 3–5 and were swept by the Titans for the first time since 2002.

==== Week 9: vs. New York Jets ====
Week 9: New York Jets at Indianapolis Colts – Game summary

Quarter	1	2	3	4	Total
Jets	7	3	6	14	**30**
**Colts**	7	21	14	3	**45**

at Lucas Oil Stadium, Indianapolis, Indiana

- Date: November 4
- Game time: 8:20 p.m. EDT
- Game weather: None (retractable roof closed)
- Game attendance: 59,593
- Referee: John Hussey
- TV announcers (Fox/NFLN/Prime Video): Joe Buck, Troy Aikman, Erin Andrews and Kristina Pink
- Recap, Game Book

Game information

**First quarter**

- IND – Nyheim Hines 34-yard run (Michael Badgley kick), 6:55. Colts 7–0. **Drive: 8 plays, 88 yards, 4:48.**
- NYJ – Elijah Moore 19-yard pass from Mike White (Matt Ammendola kick), 3:32. Tied 7–7. **Drive: 8 plays, 75 yards, 3:23.**

**Second quarter**

- IND – Jonathan Taylor 21-yard run (Michael Badgley kick), 13:24. Colts 14–7. **Drive: 9 plays, 76 yards, 5:08.**
- IND – Jack Doyle 1-yard pass from Carson Wentz (Michael Badgley kick), 4:59. Colts 21–7. **Drive: 9 plays, 46 yards, 6:04.**
- NYJ – Matt Ammendola 33-yard field goal, 1:46. Colts 21–10. **Drive: 8 plays, 60 yards, 3:13.**
- IND – Michael Pittman Jr. 11-yard pass from Carson Wentz (Michael Badgley kick), 0:12. Colts 28–10. **Drive: 9 plays, 75 yards, 1:34.**

**Third quarter**

- IND – Danny Pinter 2-yard pass from Carson Wentz (Michael Badgley kick), 6:54. Colts 35–10. **Drive: 3 plays, 40 yards, 1:06.**
- IND – Jonathan Taylor 78-yard run (Michael Badgley kick), 6:02. Colts 42–10. **Drive: 1 play, 78 yards, 0:10.**
- NYJ – Elijah Moore 19-yard pass from Josh Johnson (run failed), 3:00. Colts 42–16. **Drive: 6 plays, 75 yards, 3:02.**

**Fourth quarter**

- NYJ – Ryan Griffin 13-yard pass from Josh Johnson (Matt Ammendola kick), 11:08. Colts 42–23. **Drive: 11 plays, 66 yards, 5:03.**
- IND – Michael Badgley 39-yard field goal, 8:01. Colts 45–23. **Drive: 7 plays, 54 yards, 3:07.**
- NYJ – Ty Johnson 22-yard pass from Josh Johnson (Matt Ammendola kick), 3:35. Colts 45–30. **Drive: 13 plays, 80 yards, 4:26.**

**Top passers**

- NYJ – Josh Johnson – 27/41, 317 yards, 3 TD, INT
- IND – Carson Wentz – 22/30, 272 yards, 3 TD

**Top rushers**

- NYJ – Michael Carter – 13 rushes, 49 yards
- IND – Jonathan Taylor – 19 rushes, 172 yards, 2 TD

**Top receivers**

- NYJ – Elijah Moore – 7 receptions, 84 yards,2 TD
- IND – Michael Pittman Jr. – 5 receptions, 64 yards, TD

This was the first NFL game that ended in a 45–30 score, making a scorigami. The win improved the Colts to 4–5.

==== Week 10: vs. Jacksonville Jaguars ====
Week 10: Jacksonville Jaguars at Indianapolis Colts – Game summary

Quarter	1	2	3	4	Total
Jaguars	6	3	0	8	**17**
**Colts**	17	3	0	3	**23**

at Lucas Oil Stadium, Indianapolis, Indiana

- Date: November 14
- Game time: 1:00 p.m. EST
- Game weather: None (retractable roof closed)
- Game attendance: 60,622
- Referee: Tony Corrente
- TV announcers (CBS): Andrew Catalon, James Lofton and Sherree Burruss
- Recap, Game Book

Game information

**First quarter**

- IND – Michael Badgley 24-yard field goal, 9:57. Colts 3–0. **Drive: 10 plays, 63 yards, 5:03.**
- IND – E. J. Speed 12–yard blocked punt return (Michael Badgley kick), 8:23. Colts 10–0.
- IND – Jonathan Taylor 4-yard run (Michael Badgley kick), 2:48. Colts 17–0. **Drive: 8 plays, 53 yards, 4:07.**
- JAX – Jamal Agnew 66-yard run (kick failed, wide right), 1:03. Colts 17–6. **Drive: 4 plays, 78 yards, 1:45.**

**Second quarter**

- IND – Michael Badgley 29-yard field goal, 1:43. Colts 20–6. **Drive: 9 plays, 71 yards, 3:39.**
- JAX – Matthew Wright 56-yard field goal, 0:00. Colts 20–9. **Drive: 6 plays, 32 yards, 0:36.**

**Third quarter**

- No scoring plays.

**Fourth quarter**

- JAX – James Robinson 1-yard run (Trevor Lawrence–Dan Arnold pass), 10:34. Colts 20–17. **Drive: 10 plays, 65 yards, 5:10.**
- IND – Michael Badgley 37-yard field goal, 2:22. Colts 23–17. **Drive: 11 plays, 64 yards, 5:06.**

**Top passers**

- JAX – Trevor Lawrence – 16/35, 162 yards
- IND – Carson Wentz – 22/34, 180 yards

**Top rushers**

- JAX – Jamal Agnew – 3 rushes, 79 yards, TD
- IND – Jonathan Taylor – 21 rushes, 116 yards, TD

**Top receivers**

- JAX – Dan Arnold – 5 receptions, 67 yards
- IND – Michael Pittman Jr. – 5 receptions, 71 yards

With their fourth consecutive home win over the Jaguars, the Colts improved to 5–5.

==== Week 11: at Buffalo Bills ====
Week 11: Indianapolis Colts at Buffalo Bills – Game summary

Quarter	1	2	3	4	Total
**Colts**	14	10	14	3	**41**
Bills	0	7	0	8	**15**

at Highmark Stadium, Orchard Park, New York

- Date: November 21
- Game time: 1:00 p.m. EST
- Game weather: Cloudy, 49 °F (9 °C)
- Game attendance: 69,866
- Referee: Brad Rogers
- TV announcers (CBS): Kevin Harlan, Trent Green and Melanie Collins
- Recap, Game Book

Game information

**First quarter**

- IND – Jonathan Taylor 3-yard run (Michael Badgley kick), 8:55. Colts 7–0. **Drive: 11 plays, 65 yards, 6:05.**
- IND – Jonathan Taylor 23-yard pass from Carson Wentz (Michael Badgley kick), 1:38. Colts 14–0. **Drive: 5 plays, 57 yards, 2:20.**

**Second quarter**

- BUF – Stefon Diggs 6-yard pass from Josh Allen (Tyler Bass kick), 10:44. Colts 14–7. **Drive: 11 plays, 73 yards, 5:54.**
- IND – Michael Badgley 36-yard field goal, 2:12. Colts 17–7. **Drive: 15 plays, 58 yards, 8:32.**
- IND – Jonathan Taylor 2-yard run (Michael Badgley kick), 1:59. Colts 24–7. **Drive: 1 play, 2 yards, 0:04.**

**Third quarter**

- IND – Jonathan Taylor 10-yard run (Michael Badgley kick), 5:27. Colts 31–7. **Drive: 5 plays, 61 yards, 2:46.**
- IND – Jonathan Taylor 1-yard run (Michael Badgley kick), 0:58. Colts 38–7. **Drive: 6 plays, 24 yards, 3:31.**

**Fourth quarter**

- BUF – Stefon Diggs 9-yard pass from Josh Allen (Josh Allen run), 12:42. Colts 38–15. **Drive: 10 plays, 77 yards, 3:16.**
- IND – Michael Badgley 35-yard field goal, 6:23. Colts 41–15. **Drive: 10 plays, 63 yards, 6:19.**

**Top passers**

- IND – Carson Wentz – 11/20, 106 yards, TD
- BUF – Josh Allen – 21/35, 209 yards, 2 TD, 2 INT

**Top rushers**

- IND – Jonathan Taylor – 32 rushes, 185 yards, 4 TD
- BUF – Matt Breida – 5 rushes, 51 yards

**Top receivers**

- IND – Jack Doyle – 3 receptions, 30 yards
- BUF – Dawson Knox – 6 receptions, 80 yards

This was the Colts' second scorigami of the season, as a 41–15 score had never occurred in the NFL before. Arguably the team's most impressive win of the season, Jonathan Taylor dominated Buffalo's defense with 5 total touchdowns, improving the Colts to 6–5 and over .500 for the first time all season.

==== Week 12: vs. Tampa Bay Buccaneers ====
Week 12: Tampa Bay Buccaneers at Indianapolis Colts – Game summary

Quarter	1	2	3	4	Total
**Buccaneers**	0	14	14	10	**38**
Colts	3	21	0	7	**31**

at Lucas Oil Stadium, Indianapolis, Indiana

- Date: November 28
- Game time: 1:00 p.m. EST
- Game weather: None (retractable roof closed)
- Game attendance: 66,140
- Referee: Shawn Smith
- TV announcers (Fox): Kevin Burkhardt, Greg Olsen and Pam Oliver
- Recap, Game Book

Game information

**First quarter**

- IND – Michael Badgley 45-yard field goal, 12:31. Colts 3–0. **Drive: 4 plays, 4 yards, 1:34.**

**Second quarter**

- TB – Leonard Fournette 1-yard run (Ryan Succop kick), 13:22. Buccaneers 7–3. **Drive: 7 plays, 34 yards, 4:12.**
- IND – Ashton Dulin 62-yard pass from Carson Wentz (Michael Badgley kick), 11:44. Colts 10–7. **Drive: 3 plays, 75 yards, 1:38.**
- IND – Jack Doyle 15-yard pass from Carson Wentz (Michael Badgley kick), 5:07. Colts 17–7. **Drive: 9 plays, 90 yards, 5:43.**
- TB – Leonard Fournette 4-yard pass from Tom Brady (Ryan Succop kick), 1:56. Colts 17–14. **Drive: 8 plays, 84 yards, 3:11.**
- IND – T. Y. Hilton 4-yard pass from Carson Wentz (Michael Badgley kick), 0:18. Colts 24–14. **Drive: 14 plays, 75 yards, 1:38.**

**Third quarter**

- TB – Leonard Fournette 4-yard run (Ryan Succop kick), 8:06. Colts 24–21. **Drive: 6 plays, 65 yards, 2:52.**
- TB – Ronald Jones II 1-yard run (Ryan Succop kick), 1:06. Buccaneers 28–24. **Drive: 7 plays, 65 yards, 4:16.**

**Fourth quarter**

- TB – Ryan Succop 25-yard field goal, 10:06. Buccaneers 31–24. **Drive: 6 plays, 13 yards, 2:22.**
- IND – Jonathan Taylor 4-yard run (Michael Badgley kick), 3:29. Tied 31–31. **Drive: 10 plays, 75 yards, 6:37.**
- TB – Leonard Fournette 28-yard run (Ryan Succop kick), 0:20. Buccaneers 38–31. **Drive: 8 plays, 75 yards, 3:09.**

**Top passers**

- TB – Tom Brady – 25/34, 226 yards, TD, INT
- IND – Carson Wentz – 27/44, 306 yards, 3 TD, 2 INT

**Top rushers**

- TB – Leonard Fournette – 17 rushes, 100 yards, 3 TD
- IND – Jonathan Taylor – 16 rushes, 83 yards, TD

**Top receivers**

- TB – Rob Gronkowski – 7 receptions, 123 yards
- IND – Jack Doyle – 6 rushes, 81 yards, TD

The Colts blew a 10-point lead and turned the ball over five times, dropping them to 6–6.

==== Week 13: at Houston Texans ====
Week 13: Indianapolis Colts at Houston Texans – Game summary

Quarter	1	2	3	4	Total
**Colts**	7	7	7	10	**31**
Texans	0	0	0	0	**0**

at NRG Stadium, Houston, Texas

- Date: December 5
- Game time: 1:00 p.m. EST/12:00 p.m. CST
- Game weather: None (retractable roof closed)
- Game attendance: 65,291
- Referee: Ronald Torbert
- TV announcers (CBS): Greg Gumbel, Adam Archuleta and AJ Ross
- Recap, Game Book

Game information

**First quarter**

- IND – Jonathan Taylor 1-yard run (Michael Badgley kick), 11:26. Colts 7–0. **Drive: 6 plays, 29 yards, 3:29.**

**Second quarter**

- IND – Ashton Dulin 2-yard pass from Carson Wentz (Michael Badgley kick), 0:43. Colts 14–0. **Drive: 11 plays, 54 yards, 6:16.**

**Third quarter**

- IND – Jonathan Taylor 3-yard run (Michael Badgley kick), 9:47. Colts 21–0. **Drive: 9 plays, 75 yards, 5:13.**

**Fourth quarter**

- IND – Michael Badgley 23-yard field goal, 9:08. Colts 24–0. **Drive: 8 plays, 55 yards, 5:08.**
- IND – Deon Jackson 3-yard run (Michael Badgley kick), 1:56. Colts 31–0. **Drive: 9 plays, 40 yards, 3:33.**

**Top passers**

- IND – Carson Wentz – 16/22, 158 yards, TD
- HOU – Davis Mills – 6/14, 49 yards

**Top rushers**

- IND – Jonathan Taylor – 32 rushes, 143 yards, 2 TD
- HOU – Rex Burkhead – 8 rushes, 30 yards

**Top receivers**

- IND – Michael Pittman Jr. – 6 receptions, 77 yards
- HOU – Brandin Cooks – 3 receptions, 38 yards

With their fourth straight win over the Texans, and first shutout win since 2018, the Colts improved to 7–6 heading into their bye week.

==== Week 15: vs. New England Patriots ====
Week 15: New England Patriots at Indianapolis Colts – Game summary

Quarter	1	2	3	4	Total
Patriots	0	0	0	17	**17**
**Colts**	14	3	3	7	**27**

at Lucas Oil Stadium, Indianapolis, Indiana

- Date: December 18
- Game time: 8:20 p.m. EST
- Game weather: None (retractable roof closed)
- Game attendance: 67,391
- Referee: Carl Cheffers
- TV announcers (NFLN): Kevin Burkhardt, Greg Olsen, Pam Oliver and Kristina Pink
- Recap, Game Book

Game information

**First quarter**

- IND – Nyheim Hines 8-yard pass from Carson Wentz (Michael Badgley kick), 3:53. Colts 7–0. **Drive: 8 plays, 78 yards, 4:58.**
- IND – E. J. Speed blocked punt recovery in end zone (Michael Badgley kick), 0:14. Colts 14–0.

**Second quarter**

- IND – Michael Badgley 25-yard field goal, 4:31. Colts 17–0. **Drive: 14 plays, 58 yards, 8:57.**

**Third quarter**

- IND – Michael Badgley 41-yard field goal, 11:49. Colts 20–0. **Drive: 4 plays, −3 yards, 1:49.**

**Fourth quarter**

- NE – Hunter Henry 12-yard pass from Mac Jones (Nick Folk kick), 14:55. Colts 20–7. **Drive: 9 plays, 61 yards, 4:38.**
- NE – Nick Folk 25-yard field goal, 8:57. Colts 20–10. **Drive: 12 plays, 46 yards, 4:28.**
- NE – Hunter Henry 7-yard pass from Mac Jones (Nick Folk kick), 2:21. Colts 20–17. **Drive: 7 plays, 82 yards, 1:27.**
- IND – Jonathan Taylor 67-yard run (Michael Badgley kick), 2:01. Colts 27–17. **Drive: 2 plays, 69 yards, 0:20.**

**Top passers**

- NE – Mac Jones – 26/45, 299 yards, 2 TD, 2 INT
- IND – Carson Wentz – 5/12, 57 yards, TD, INT

**Top rushers**

- NE – Rhamondre Stevenson – 10 rushes, 36 yards
- IND – Jonathan Taylor – 29 rushes, 170 yards, TD

**Top receivers**

- NE – Hunter Henry – 6 receptions, 77 yards, 2 TD
- IND – Zach Pascal – 1 reception, 23 yards

With the win, the Colts improved to 8–6 and beat the Patriots for the first time since Week 10 of the 2009 season.

==== Week 16: at Arizona Cardinals ====
Christmas Day games

Week 16: Indianapolis Colts at Arizona Cardinals – Game summary

Quarter	1	2	3	4	Total
**Colts**	7	5	3	7	**22**
Cardinals	6	0	7	3	**16**

at State Farm Stadium, Glendale, Arizona

- Date: December 25
- Game time: 8:15 p.m. EST/6:15 p.m. MST
- Game weather: None (retractable roof closed)
- Game attendance: 63,900
- Referee: Craig Wrolstad
- TV announcers (NFLN): Joe Davis, Kurt Warner, Melissa Stark and Peter Schrager
- Recap, Game Book

Game information

**First quarter**

- IND – T. Y. Hilton 1-yard pass from Carson Wentz (Michael Badgley kick), 6:11. Colts 7–0. **Drive: 6 plays, 59 yards, 3:29.**
- ARI – Chase Edmonds 2-yard run (kick failed), 3:03. Colts 7–6. **Drive: 7 plays, 90 yards, 3:08.**

**Second quarter**

- IND – Penalty on Kyler Murray enforced in end zone for a Safety, 4:20. Colts 9–6.
- IND – Michael Badgley 41-yard field goal, 0:01. Colts 12–6. **Drive: 10 plays, 45 yards, 4:19.**

**Third quarter**

- ARI – Antoine Wesley 24-yard pass from Kyler Murray (Matt Prater kick), 10:53. Cardinals 13–12. **Drive: 3 plays, 42 yards, 1:22.**
- IND – Michael Badgley 37-yard field goal, 0:03. Colts 15–13. **Drive: 10 plays, 56 yards, 5:18.**

**Fourth quarter**

- IND – Dezmon Patmon 14-yard pass from Carson Wentz (Michael Badgley kick), 6:37. Colts 22–13. **Drive: 7 plays, 69 yards, 4:30.**
- ARI – Matt Prater 28-yard field goal, 0:42. Colts 22–16. **Drive: 16 plays, 81 yards, 3:34.**

**Top passers**

- IND – Carson Wentz – 18/28, 225 yards, 2 TD
- ARI – Kyler Murray – 27/43, 245 yards, TD

**Top rushers**

- IND – Jonathan Taylor – 27 rushes, 108 yards
- ARI – Kyler Murray – 4 rushes, 74 yards

**Top receivers**

- IND – Michael Pittman Jr. – 8 receptions, 82 yards
- ARI – Chase Edmonds – 8 receptions, 71 yards

The Colts overcame several injuries and positive COVID-19 tests on their offensive line and defensive backfield to defeat the skidding Cardinals, improving them to 9–6 and putting them on the cusp of clinching a playoff berth.

==== Week 17: vs. Las Vegas Raiders ====
Week 17: Las Vegas Raiders at Indianapolis Colts – Game summary

Quarter	1	2	3	4	Total
**Raiders**	7	6	0	10	**23**
Colts	0	10	7	3	**20**

at Lucas Oil Stadium, Indianapolis, Indiana

- Date: January 2
- Game time: 1:00 p.m. EST
- Game weather: None (retractable roof closed)
- Game attendance: 65,985
- Referee: Brad Rogers
- TV announcers (Fox): Kenny Albert, Jonathan Vilma and Sara Walsh
- Recap, Game Book

Game information

**First quarter**

- LV – Josh Jacobs 2-yard run (Daniel Carlson kick), 7:51. Raiders 7–0. **Drive: 12 plays, 75 yards, 7:09.**

**Second quarter**

- LV – Daniel Carlson 47-yard field goal, 14:12. Raiders 10–0. **Drive: 7 plays, 6 yards, 3:30.**
- IND – Michael Badgley 46-yard field goal, 10:07. Raiders 10–3. **Drive: 7 plays, 47 yards, 4:05.**
- LV – Daniel Carlson 44-yard field goal, 1:47. Raiders 13–3. **Drive: 9 plays, 31 yards, 4:30.**
- IND – Jonathan Taylor 1-yard run (Michael Badgley kick), 0:01. Raiders 13–10. **Drive: 10 plays, 60 yards, 1:46.**

**Third quarter**

- IND – T. Y. Hilton 45-yard pass from Carson Wentz (Michael Badgley kick), 11:28. Colts 17–13. **Drive: 6 plays, 75 yards, 3:32.**

**Fourth quarter**

- LV –Hunter Renfrow 11-yard pass from Derek Carr (Daniel Carlson kick), 11:18. Raiders 20–17. **Drive: 6 plays, 62 yards, 3:21.**
- IND – Michael Badgley 41-yard field goal, 1:56. Tied 20–20. **Drive: 14 plays, 53 yards, 9:22.**
- LV – Daniel Carlson 33-yard field goal, 0:00. Raiders 23–20. **Drive: 10 plays, 60 yards, 1:56.**

**Top passers**

- LV – Derek Carr – 24/31, 255 yards, TD, 2 INT
- IND – Carson Wentz – 16/27, 148 yards, TD

**Top rushers**

- LV – Josh Jacobs – 16 rushes, 63 yards, TD
- IND – Jonathan Taylor – 20 rushes, 108 yards, TD

**Top receivers**

- LV – Zay Jones – 8 receptions, 120 yards
- IND – Michael Pittman Jr. – 6 receptions, 47 yards

With this loss, the Colts fell to 9–7 and were prevented from clinching a playoff berth this week.

==== Week 18: at Jacksonville Jaguars ====
Week 18: Indianapolis Colts at Jacksonville Jaguars – Game summary

Quarter	1	2	3	4	Total
Colts	0	3	0	8	**11**
**Jaguars**	7	6	10	3	**26**

at TIAA Bank Field, Jacksonville, Florida

- Date: January 9
- Game time: 1:00 p.m. EST
- Game weather: 77 °F (25 °C)
- Game attendance: 60,516
- Referee: Clay Martin
- TV announcers (CBS): Greg Gumbel, Adam Archuleta and AJ Ross
- Recap, Game Book

Game information

**First quarter**

- JAX – Laquon Treadwell 2-yard pass from Trevor Lawrence (Matthew Wright kick), 7:48. Jaguars 7–0. **Drive: 12 plays, 75 yards, 7:12.**

**Second quarter**

- IND – Michael Badgley 41-yard field goal, 9:08. Jaguars 7–3. **Drive: 12 plays, 57 yards, 7:48.**
- JAX – Matthew Wright 22-yard field goal, 3:06. Jaguars 10–3. **Drive: 11 plays, 71 yards, 6:02.**
- JAX – Matthew Wright 20-yard field goal, 0:00. Jaguars 13–3. **Drive: 11 plays, 71 yards, 1:35.**

**Third quarter**

- JAX – Matthew Wright 39-yard field goal, 11:32. Jaguars 16–3. **Drive: 4 plays, 2 yards, 1:01.**
- JAX – Marvin Jones 3-yard pass from Trevor Lawrence (Matthew Wright kick), 3:08. Jaguars 23–3. **Drive: 6 plays, 45 yards, 3:44.**

**Fourth quarter**

- JAX – Matthew Wright 31-yard field goal, 8:15. Jaguars 26–3. **Drive: 6 plays, 28 yards, 1:26.**
- IND – Michael Pittman Jr. 12-yard pass from Carson Wentz (Carson Wentz–Michael Pittman Jr. pass), 4:26. Jaguars 26–11. **Drive: 9 plays, 75 yards, 3:49.**

**Top passers**

- IND – Carson Wentz – 17/29, 185 yards, TD, INT
- JAX – Trevor Lawrence – 23/32, 223 yards, 2 TD

**Top rushers**

- IND – Jonathan Taylor – 15 rushes, 77 yards
- JAX – Ryquell Armstead – 9 rushes, 52 yards

**Top receivers**

- IND – Michael Pittman Jr. – 6 receptions, 64 yards, TD
- JAX – Marvin Jones – 7 receptions, 88 yards, TD

In a shocking fashion, the Colts were upset by the 2–14 Jaguars thus ending their playoff hopes, as the Steelers won later that day.

=== Standings ===
==== Division ====
AFC South
	W	L	T	PCT	DIV	CONF	PF	PA	STK
^{(1)} Tennessee Titans	12	5	0	.706	5–1	8–4	419	354	W3
Indianapolis Colts	9	8	0	.529	3–3	7–5	451	365	L2
Houston Texans	4	13	0	.235	3–3	4–8	280	452	L2
Jacksonville Jaguars	3	14	0	.176	1–5	3–9	253	457	W1

==== Conference ====
AFC
#	Team	Division	W	L	T	PCT	DIV	CONF	SOS	SOV	STK
**Division winners**
1 (Note: Tennessee finished ahead of Kansas City based on head-to-head victory, claiming the No. 1 seed.)	Tennessee Titans	South	12	5	0	.706	5–1	8–4	.472	.480	W3
2	Kansas City Chiefs	West	12	5	0	.706	5–1	7–5	.538	.517	W1
3	Buffalo Bills	East	11	6	0	.647	5–1	7–5	.472	.428	W4
4	Cincinnati Bengals	North	10	7	0	.588	4–2	8–4	.472	.462	L1
**Wild cards**
5 (Note: Las Vegas claimed the No. 5 seed over New England based on win percentage in common games (5–1 vs. 2–4 against: Miami, Dallas, LA Chargers, Cleveland, and Indianapolis).)	Las Vegas Raiders	West	10	7	0	.588	3–3	8–4	.510	.515	W4
6	New England Patriots	East	10	7	0	.588	3–3	8–4	.481	.394	L1
7	Pittsburgh Steelers	North	9	7	1	.559	4–2	7–5	.521	.490	W2
**Did not qualify for the postseason**
8 (Note: Indianapolis finished ahead of Miami and Los Angeles based on conference record (7–5 vs. 6–6).)	Indianapolis Colts	South	9	8	0	.529	3–3	7–5	.495	.431	L2
9 (Note: Miami finished ahead of LA Chargers based on win percentage in common games (5–1 vs. 2–4 against: New England, Las Vegas, Houston, Baltimore, and NY Giants).)	Miami Dolphins	East	9	8	0	.529	4–2	6–6	.464	.379	W1
10	Los Angeles Chargers	West	9	8	0	.529	3–3	6–6	.510	.500	L1
11 (Note: Cleveland finished ahead of Baltimore based on division record (3–3 vs. 1–5).)	Cleveland Browns	North	8	9	0	.471	3–3	5–7	.514	.415	W1
12	Baltimore Ravens	North	8	9	0	.471	1–5	5–7	.531	.460	L6
13	Denver Broncos	West	7	10	0	.412	1–5	3–9	.484	.357	L4
14 (Note: NY Jets finished ahead of Houston based on head-to-head victory.)	New York Jets	East	4	13	0	.235	0–6	4–8	.512	.426	L2
15	Houston Texans	South	4	13	0	.235	3–3	4–8	.498	.397	L2
16	Jacksonville Jaguars	South	3	14	0	.176	1–5	3–9	.512	.569	W1
**Tiebreakers** (Note: When breaking ties for three or more teams under the NFL's rules, they are first broken within divisions, then comparing only the highest-ranked remaining team from each division.)
