= Dayo Odeyingbo =

American football player (born 1999)

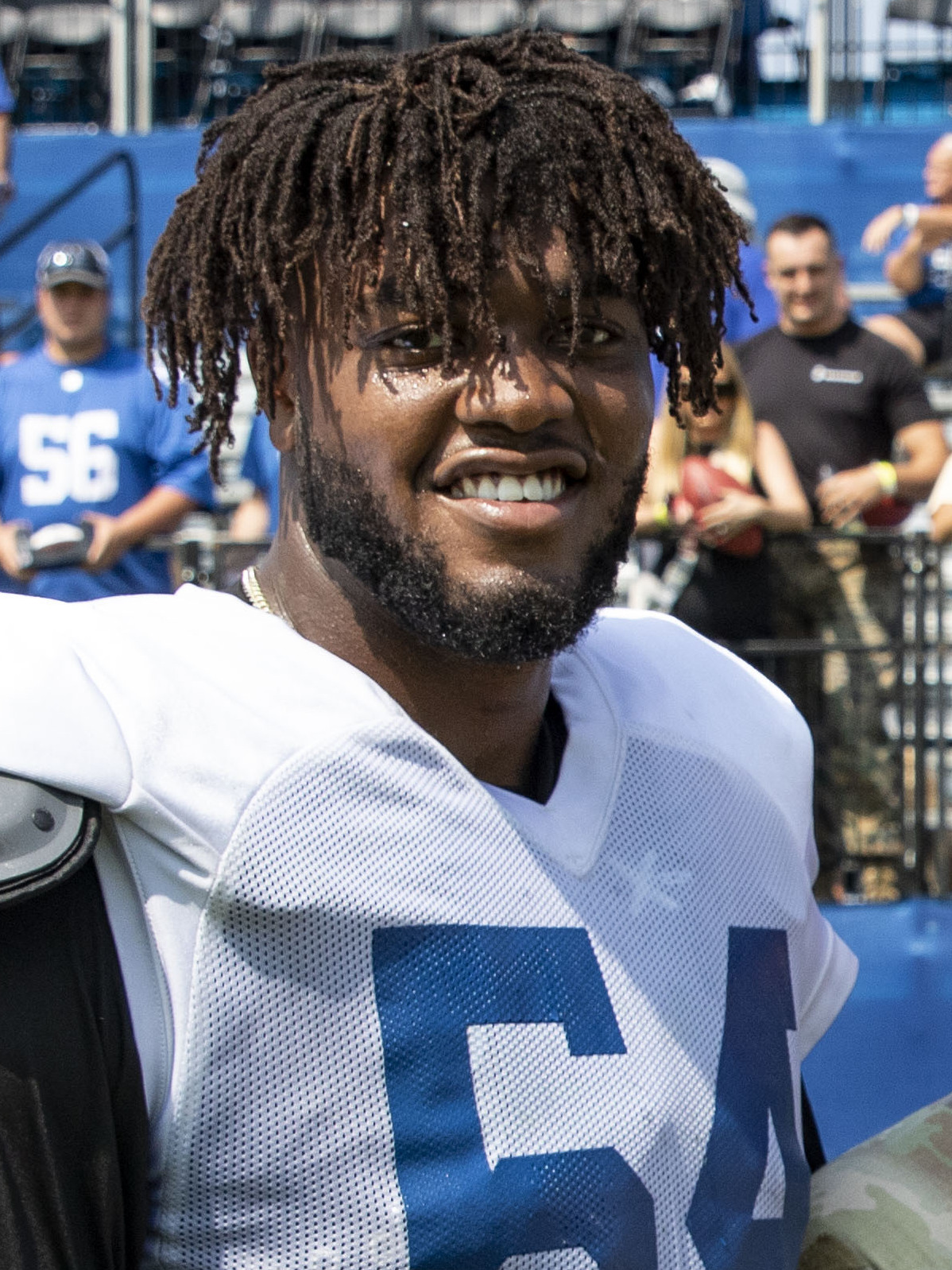
- Odeyingbo with the Indianapolis Colts in 2023

No. 55 – Chicago Bears
- Position: Defensive end
- Roster status: Injured reserve

Personal information
- Born: September 24, 1999 (age 27); Brooklyn, New York, U.S.
- Listed height: 6 ft 5 in (1.96 m)
- Listed weight: 282 lb (128 kg)

Career information
- High school: Ranchview (Irving, Texas)
- College: Vanderbilt (2017–2020)
- NFL draft: 2021: 2nd round, 54th overall pick

Career history
- Indianapolis Colts (2021–2024); Chicago Bears (2025–present)

Awards and highlights
- First-team All-SEC (2020)

Career NFL statistics as of 2025
- Total tackles: 127
- Sacks: 17.5
- Pass deflections: 3
- Forced fumbles: 5
- Fumble recoveries: 3
- Stats at Pro Football Reference

Temidayo Jordan "Dayo" Odeyingbo (DIE-oh Oh-DANG-boh; born September 24, 1999) is an American professional football defensive end for the Chicago Bears of the National Football League (NFL). He played college football for the Vanderbilt Commodores, and was selected by the Indianapolis Colts in the second round of the 2021 NFL draft.

== Early life ==
The son of Nigerian immigrants, Odeyingbo was born in Brooklyn, New York, and grew up in Irving, Texas, where he attended Ranchview High School. He had 108 tackles and 12 sacks over the course of his high school career. Odeyingbo committed to play college football at Vanderbilt over offers from Texas, Oklahoma, Texas A&M, Colorado, Baylor, and Purdue.

== College career ==
Odeyingbo was a member of the Vanderbilt Commodores for four seasons. As a senior, he was named second-team All-SEC after recording 32 tackles, 8.0 tackles for loss, and 5.5 sacks in eight games. Odeyingbo finished his collegiate career with 125 tackles, 31.0 tackles for loss, and 12.0 sacks. Odeyingbo tore his achilles tendon while preparing for the 2021 NFL draft.

== Professional career ==
Pre-draft measurables
Height	Weight	Arm length	Hand span	Wingspan
6 ft 5 1/8 in (1.96 m)	285 lb (129 kg)	35 1/4 in (0.90 m)	10 1/8 in (0.26 m)	7 ft 2 3/8 in (2.19 m)
All values from Pro Day

=== Indianapolis Colts ===
Despite his injury, Odeyingbo was selected by the Indianapolis Colts in the second round with the 54th overall pick in the 2021 NFL Draft. On May 6, 2021, Odeyingbo officially signed with the Colts. He was placed on the reserve/non-football injury list to start the 2021 season. He was activated on October 30.

Odeyingbo played in all 17 games in 2023, recording 38 tackles and finished third on the team with eight sacks.

=== Chicago Bears ===
On March 13, 2025, Odeyingbo signed a three-year, $48 million contract with the Chicago Bears. He started all eight of his appearances for Chicago, recording one pass deflection, one sack, and 21 combined tackles. In Week 9 against the Cincinnati Bengals, Odeyingbo suffered a torn Achilles tendon, ending his season.

== NFL career statistics ==
Legend
**Bold**	Career high

=== Regular season ===
Year	Team	Games		Tackles					Interceptions						Fumbles				
Year	Team	GP	GS	Cmb	Solo	Ast	Sck	TFL	Int	Yds	Avg	Lng	TD	PD	FF	Fmb	FR	Yds	TD
2021	IND	10	0	6	5	1	0.5	0	0	0	0.0	0	0	0	1	0	0	0	0
2022	IND	17	4	31	18	13	5.0	5	0	0	0.0	0	0	0	0	0	0	0	0
2023	IND	17	1	**38**	**22**	16	**8.0**	**9**	0	0	0.0	0	0	**2**	**2**	0	**2**	0	0
2024	IND	17	14	31	13	**18**	3.0	7	0	0	0.0	0	0	0	**2**	0	1	0	0
2025	CHI	8	8	21	9	12	1.0	2	0	0	0.0	0	0	1	0	0	0	0	0
Career		69	27	127	67	60	17.5	23	0	0	0.0	0	0	3	5	0	3	0	0

== Personal life ==
Odeyingbo's older brother, Dare, also played football at Vanderbilt and for the Cincinnati Bengals and Tampa Bay Buccaneers.
