= T. J. Carrie =

American football player (born 1990)

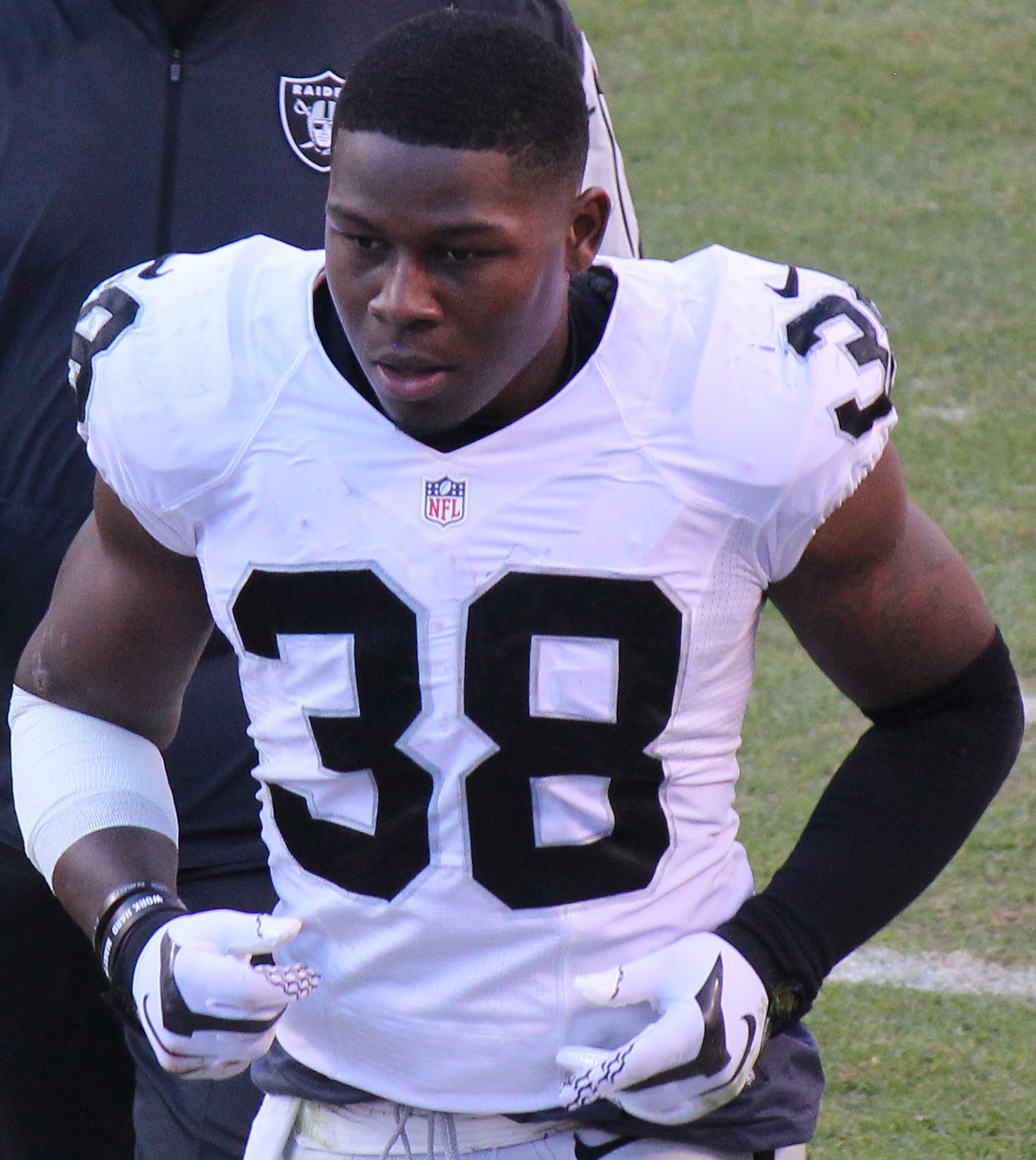
- Carrie with the Oakland Raiders in 2015

No. 38, 27
- Position: Cornerback

Personal information
- Born: July 28, 1990 (age 36); Rodeo, California, U.S.
- Listed height: 6 ft 0 in (1.83 m)
- Listed weight: 208 lb (94 kg)

Career information
- High school: De La Salle (Concord, California)
- College: Ohio (2008–2013)
- NFL draft: 2014: 7th round, 219th overall pick

Career history
- Oakland Raiders (2014–2017); Cleveland Browns (2018–2019); Indianapolis Colts (2020–2021); Baltimore Ravens (2022)*; Carolina Panthers (2022)
- * Offseason or practice squad member only

Awards and highlights
- First-team All-MAC (2013); Second-team All-MAC (2011)

Career NFL statistics
- Total tackles: 395
- Sacks: 2.0
- Forced fumbles: 7
- Interceptions: 7
- Pass deflections: 52
- Defensive touchdowns: 2
- Stats at Pro Football Reference

Travis J. Carrie (born July 28, 1990) is an American former professional football player who was a cornerback in the National Football League (NFL). He played college football for the Ohio Bobcats and was selected by the Oakland Raiders of the National Football League (NFL) in the seventh round of the 2014 NFL draft. Carrie has also played with the Cleveland Browns, Indianapolis Colts, and Carolina Panthers.

== Early life ==
Carrie attended De La Salle High School in Concord, California, where he was a member of the state championship De LaSalle football team. He totaled 90 tackles, forced two fumbles, recorded two interceptions and 10 pass deflections, and also blocked one punt as a senior. He was voted first-team All-Conference and was an honor roll student. Also a letterman in track and field, Carrie placed third in the 100-meters at the 2008 CIF T&F Meet with a time of 10.87 seconds. He posted personal-best times of 10.83 seconds in the 100-meter dash and 21.88 seconds in the 200-meter dash at the 2008 Sacramento Meet of Champions.

During his freshman year of high school, Carrie passed out during a preseason workout session, and it was subsequently discovered that his coronary artery was incorrectly positioned between his lungs. He underwent open heart surgery to correct the condition, and spent the following year recovering before resuming athletics.

== College career ==
Carrie played four seasons at Ohio University. He appeared in 50 games with 36 starts, contributing on defense and special teams. He totaled 165 tackles (108 solo), nine interceptions, 36 passes defended, three sacks and two forced fumbles over his career. He also served as the team's punt returner, racking up 659 return yards on 56 returns with one touchdown.

== Professional career ==
Pre-draft measurables
Height	Weight	Arm length	Hand span	40-yard dash	10-yard split	20-yard split	20-yard shuttle	Three-cone drill	Vertical jump	Broad jump	Bench press
5 ft 11 5/8 in (1.82 m)	206 lb (93 kg)	31 7/8 in (0.81 m)	9 3/4 in (0.25 m)	4.43 s	1.55 s	2.58 s	4.21 s	6.97 s	41 in (1.04 m)	10 ft 3 in (3.12 m)	17 reps
All values from NFL Combine and Pro Day

=== Oakland Raiders ===
==== 2014 ====
The Oakland Raiders selected Carrie in the seventh round (219th overall) of the 2014 NFL draft. Carrie was the 29th cornerback drafted in 2014.

On May 21, 2014, the Raiders signed Carrie to a four-year, $2.28 million contract that includes a signing bonus of $66,964.

Throughout training camp, Carrie competed to be the Raiders' nickelback against Chimdi Chewka, Keith McGill, and Taiwan Jones. Head coach Dennis Allen named Carrie the nickelback and third cornerback on the depth chart, behind starters Tarell Brown and Carlos Rogers. He also began the season as the Raiders' primary punt returner.

He made his professional regular season debut in the Raiders' season-opener at the New York Jets and recorded five combined tackles, forced a fumble, and recovered a fumble during their 19–14 loss. Carrie forced a fumble by Jets' quarterback Geno Smith in the second quarter and recovered it before being tackled by Willie Colon. On September 28, 2014, Carrie recorded five solo tackles, broke up a pass, and made his first career interception during the Raiders' 38–14 loss to the Miami Dolphins in Week 4. Carrie intercepted a pass by Dolphins' quarterback Ryan Tannehill, that was originally intended for tight end Dion Sims, and returned it for a 28-yard gain in the third quarter. The following day, the Oakland Raiders announced their decision to fire head coach Dennis Allen after they began the season with an 0–4 record. They named assistant head coach/offensive line coach Tony Sparano was named the interim head coach for the remainder of the season. On October 12, 2014, Carrie earned his first career start as an extra defensive back and recorded four combined tackles and made two pass deflections in a 31–28 loss against the San Diego Chargers in Week 6. He was inactive for the Raiders' Week 10 loss to the Denver Broncos due to an ankle injury. Carrie was also sidelined for a Week 12 loss to the Kansas City Chiefs due to his ankle injury. In Week 14, he collected a season-high seven solo tackles in the Raiders' 24–13 win against the San Francisco 49ers. He was also inactive for the Raiders' Week 17 loss at the Denver Broncos after aggravating his ankle injury. He finished the season with 44 combined tackles (37 solo), eight pass deflections, and an interception in 13 games and fours starts. He also appeared as a kick returner and gained 352-yards on 15 returns and returned 26 punts for 195-yards.

==== 2015 ====
On January 14, 2015, the Oakland Raiders announced their decision to hire Denver Broncos defensive coordinator Jack Del Rio as their new head coach. During training camp, Carrie competed against Keith McGill to be a starting cornerback after the Raiders opted not to re-sign Carlos Rogers or Tarell Brown. Head coach Jack Del Rio named Carrie and D. J. Hayden the starting cornerbacks to begin the regular season.

Carrie was inactive during a Week 10 loss at the Pittsburgh Steelers due to injuries to his hip and shoulder. In Week 11, he collected a season-high eight combined tackles in the Raiders' 18–13 loss at the Detroit Lions. He finished the 2015 NFL season with 52 combined tackles (42 solo), nine pass deflections, and an interception in 15 games and 14 starts.

==== 2016 ====
Carrie entered training camp as the Raiders' nickelback after the emergence of David Amerson and the free agent signing of Sean Smith. Carrie competed against D. J. Hayden for the role as the nickelback. Head coach Jack Del Rio named Carrie the fourth cornerback on the depth chart to start the season in 2016, behind Sean Smith, David Amerson, and D.J. Hayden. In Week 16, he collected a season-high five solo tackles during a 33–25 win against the Indianapolis Colts. He finished his third season in 2016 with 25 combined tackles (22 solo), four pass deflections, and an interception in 16 games and four starts.

The Raiders finished second in the AFC West with a 12–4 record. On January 7, 2017, Carrie started in his first career playoff game and recorded three solo tackles and deflected a pass during the Raiders' 27–14 loss at the Houston Texans in the AFC Wild Card Round.

==== 2017 ====
Throughout training camp, Carrie competed to retain his job as the first-team nickelback against rookie first round pick Gareon Conley. Head coach Jack Del Rio named Carrie and David Amerson the starting cornerbacks to begin the regular season. In Week 6, Carrie collected a season-high eight combined tackles and deflected two passes during a 17–16 loss against the Los Angeles Chargers. He started in all 16 games in 2017 and recorded a career-high 84 combined tackles (70 solo) and nine pass deflections.

=== Cleveland Browns ===
On March 14, 2018, the Cleveland Browns signed Carrie to a four-year, $31 million contract that includes $15.50 million guaranteed and a signing bonus of $3.6 million. Throughout training camp, he competed to be a starting cornerback against Terrance Mitchell and E. J. Gaines. Head coach Hue Jackson named him the third cornerback on the depth chart to start the regular season, behind Denzel Ward and Terrance Mitchell. On September 30, 2018, he collected 12 combined tackles (seven solo) in the Browns' 45–42 loss at the Raiders in Week 4.

In Week 3 of the 2019 season against the Los Angeles Rams, Carrie recorded his first interception of the season off Jared Goff in the 20–13 loss.

Carrie was released by the Browns on February 17, 2020.

=== Indianapolis Colts ===
On March 30, 2020, Carrie signed with the Indianapolis Colts.

In Week 2 against the Minnesota Vikings, Carrie recorded his first interception as a Colt off a pass thrown by Kirk Cousins during the 28–11 win. The following game in Week 3 against the New York Jets, Carrie caught another interception, this time thrown by Sam Darnold that he returned for a 47 yard touchdown during the 36–7 win.

In the Colts' Week 10 matchup against the Tennessee Titans on Thursday Night Football, Carrie scored his second career touchdown after he recovered a blocked punt by E. J. Speed and returned it for six yards in the endzone.

On April 18, 2021, Carrie re-signed with the Colts. He was placed on injured reserve on September 29, 2021. He was activated on November 13.

=== Baltimore Ravens ===
On September 14, 2022, Carrie signed with the practice squad of the Baltimore Ravens. He was released on September 27.

=== Carolina Panthers ===
On November 15, 2022, Carrie was signed to the Carolina Panthers practice squad. He was promoted to the active roster on December 6.

== NFL career statistics ==
Legend
**Bold**	Career high

=== Regular season ===
Year	Team	Games		Tackles					Interceptions					Fumbles			
Year	Team	GP	GS	Cmb	Solo	Ast	Sck	TFL	Int	Yds	TD	Lng	PD	FF	FR	Yds	TD
2014	OAK	13	4	44	37	7	0.0	2	1	28	0	28	**9**	1	**2**	0	0
2015	OAK	15	14	52	42	10	0.0	0	1	2	0	2	**9**	1	0	0	0
2016	OAK	**16**	3	25	22	3	0.0	0	1	14	0	14	4	1	1	0	0
2017	OAK	**16**	**16**	**84**	**70**	14	0.0	3	0	0	0	0	**9**	0	**2**	0	0
2018	CLE	**16**	8	74	58	**16**	**1.0**	3	1	0	0	0	8	**2**	1	0	0
2019	CLE	**16**	6	52	40	12	**1.0**	**4**	1	0	0	0	4	1	1	4	0
2020	IND	15	2	32	25	7	0.0	1	**2**	**47**	**1**	**47**	8	0	1	**25**	0
2021	IND	11	1	23	21	2	0.0	0	0	0	0	0	1	0	1	14	0
2022	CAR	7	0	9	5	4	0.0	0	0	0	0	0	0	1	1	0	0
Total		125	54	395	320	75	2.0	13	7	91	1	47	52	7	10	43	0

=== Playoffs ===
Year	Team	Games		Tackles					Interceptions					Fumbles			
Year	Team	GP	GS	Cmb	Solo	Ast	Sck	TFL	Int	Yds	TD	Lng	PD	FF	FR	Yds	TD
2016	OAK	**1**	**1**	3	**3**	0	0.0	0	0	0	0	0	**1**	0	0	0	0
2020	IND	**1**	**1**	**4**	2	**2**	0.0	0	0	0	0	0	0	0	0	0	0
Total		2	2	7	5	2	0.0	0	0	0	0	0	1	0	0	0	0
