= 2021 All-Pro Team =

Official list of the best NFL players in 2021

The 2021 All-Pro teams were named by the Associated Press (AP), Pro Football Writers of America (PFWA), and Sporting News (SN) for performance in the 2021 NFL season. Any player selected to the first-team of any of the teams can be described as an "All-Pro." The AP team, with first-team and second-team selections, was chosen by a national panel of fifty NFL writers and broadcasters. The Sporting News All-NFL team was voted on by NFL players and executives. The PFWA team is selected by its more than 300 national members who are accredited media members covering the NFL.

== Teams ==
Offense
| Position | First team | Second team |
|---|---|---|
| Quarterback | Aaron Rodgers, Green Bay (AP, PFWA, SN) | Tom Brady, Tampa Bay (AP-2) |
| Running back | Jonathan Taylor, Indianapolis (AP, PFWA, SN); Nick Chubb, Cleveland (PFWA); Joe Mixon, Cincinnati (SN) | |
| Wide receiver | Davante Adams, Green Bay (AP, PFWA, SN); Cooper Kupp, Los Angeles Rams (AP, PFWA, SN); Deebo Samuel, San Francisco (AP) | Ja'Marr Chase, Cincinnati (AP-2); Justin Jefferson, Minnesota (AP-2) |
| Tight end | Mark Andrews, Baltimore (AP, PFWA); Travis Kelce, Kansas City (SN) | Travis Kelce, Kansas City (AP-2) |
| Left tackle | Trent Williams, San Francisco (AP) | Rashawn Slater, Los Angeles Chargers (AP-2) |
| Left guard | Joel Bitonio, Cleveland (AP) | Quenton Nelson, Indianapolis (AP-2) |
| Center | Jason Kelce, Philadelphia (AP, PFWA, SN) | Corey Linsley, Los Angeles Chargers (AP-2) |
| Right guard | Zack Martin, Dallas (AP) | Wyatt Teller, Cleveland (AP-2) |
| Right tackle | Tristan Wirfs, Tampa Bay (AP) | Lane Johnson, Philadelphia (AP-2) |
| Tackle | Trent Williams, San Francisco (PFWA, SN); Tristan Wirfs, Tampa Bay (PFWA, SN) | |
| Guard | Joel Bitonio, Cleveland (PFWA, SN); Zack Martin, Dallas (PFWA, SN) | |

Special teams
| Position | First team | Second team |
|---|---|---|
| Kicker | Justin Tucker, Baltimore (AP, PFWA, SN) | Daniel Carlson, Las Vegas (AP-2) |
| Punter | A. J. Cole, Las Vegas (AP, PFWA); Bryan Anger, Dallas (SN) | Bryan Anger, Dallas (AP-2) |
| Kick returner | Braxton Berrios, New York Jets (AP, PFWA); Kene Nwangwu, Minnesota (SN) | Andre Roberts, Los Angeles Chargers (AP-2) |
| Punt returner | Devin Duvernay, Baltimore (AP, PFWA); Jakeem Grant, Miami/Chicago (SN) | Jakeem Grant, Miami/Chicago (AP-2) |
| Special teamer | J. T. Gray, New Orleans (AP, PFWA) | Ashton Dulin, Indianapolis (AP-2t); Matthew Slater, New England (AP-2t) |
| Long snapper | Luke Rhodes, Indianapolis (AP) | Josh Harris, Atlanta (AP-2) |

Defense
| Position | First team | Second team |
|---|---|---|
| Edge rusher | T. J. Watt, Pittsburgh (AP); Myles Garrett, Cleveland (AP) | Robert Quinn, Chicago (AP-2); Maxx Crosby, Las Vegas (AP-2) |
| Defensive end | Myles Garrett, Cleveland (PFWA, SN); Nick Bosa, San Francisco (PFWA, SN) | |
| Interior lineman | Aaron Donald, Los Angeles Rams (AP); Cameron Heyward, Pittsburgh (AP) | Jeffery Simmons, Tennessee (AP-2); Chris Jones, Kansas City (AP-2) |
| Defensive tackle | Aaron Donald, Los Angeles Rams (PFWA, SN); Cameron Heyward, Pittsburgh (PFWA); Chris Jones, Kansas City (SN) | |
| Linebacker | Micah Parsons, Dallas (AP, SN); Darius Leonard, Indianapolis (AP, SN); De'Vondre Campbell, Green Bay (AP, PFWA); T. J. Watt, Pittsburgh (SN) | Demario Davis, New Orleans (AP-2); Roquan Smith, Chicago (AP-2); Bobby Wagner, Seattle (AP-2) |
| Outside linebacker | Micah Parsons, Dallas (PFWA); T. J. Watt, Pittsburgh (PFWA) | |
| Cornerback | Trevon Diggs, Dallas (AP, PFWA, SN); Jalen Ramsey, Los Angeles Rams (AP, PFWA, SN) | A. J. Terrell, Atlanta (AP-2); J. C. Jackson, New England (AP-2) |
| Safety | Kevin Byard, Tennessee (AP, PFWA, SN); Jordan Poyer, Buffalo (AP, PFWA); Derwin James, Los Angeles Chargers (SN) | Justin Simmons, Denver (AP-2); Micah Hyde, Buffalo (AP-2t); Budda Baker, Arizona (AP-2t) |

AP source:
PFWA source:
SN source:

Five players were unanimous selections via the AP ballot, including RB Jonathan Taylor (Indianapolis), WRs Davante Adams (Green Bay) and Cooper Kupp (Los Angeles Rams), EDGE T. J. Watt (Pittsburgh), and IDL Aaron Donald (Los Angeles Rams).

== Key ==
- AP = Associated Press first-team All-Pro
- AP-2 = Associated Press second-team All-Pro
- AP-2t = Tied for second-team All-Pro in the AP vote
- PFWA = Pro Football Writers Association All-NFL
- SN = Sporting News All-Pro

== Number of AP selections per team ==
American Football Conference
| Team | Selections |
|---|---|
| Baltimore Ravens | 3 |
| Buffalo Bills | 2 |
| Cincinnati Bengals | 2 |
| Cleveland Browns | 5 |
| Denver Broncos | 1 |
| Houston Texans | 0 |
| Indianapolis Colts | 5 |
| Jacksonville Jaguars | 0 |
| Kansas City Chiefs | 2 |
| Las Vegas Raiders | 3 |
| Los Angeles Chargers | 4 |
| Miami Dolphins | 0 |
| New England Patriots | 2 |
| New York Jets | 1 |
| Pittsburgh Steelers | 2 |
| Tennessee Titans | 2 |

National Football Conference
| Team | Selections |
|---|---|
| Arizona Cardinals | 1 |
| Atlanta Falcons | 2 |
| Carolina Panthers | 0 |
| Chicago Bears | 3 |
| Dallas Cowboys | 5 |
| Detroit Lions | 0 |
| Green Bay Packers | 3 |
| Los Angeles Rams | 3 |
| Minnesota Vikings | 2 |
| New Orleans Saints | 2 |
| New York Giants | 0 |
| Philadelphia Eagles | 2 |
| San Francisco 49ers | 3 |
| Seattle Seahawks | 1 |
| Tampa Bay Buccaneers | 2 |
| Washington Football Team | 0 |

== Position differences ==
PFWA and SN do not separate the tackles and guards into more specific positions as the AP does. Additionally, PFWA and SN formally select defensive ends as opposed to edge rushers, while PFWA selects outside linebackers separately from middle linebackers.
