= Sam Lafferty =

American ice hockey player (born 1995)

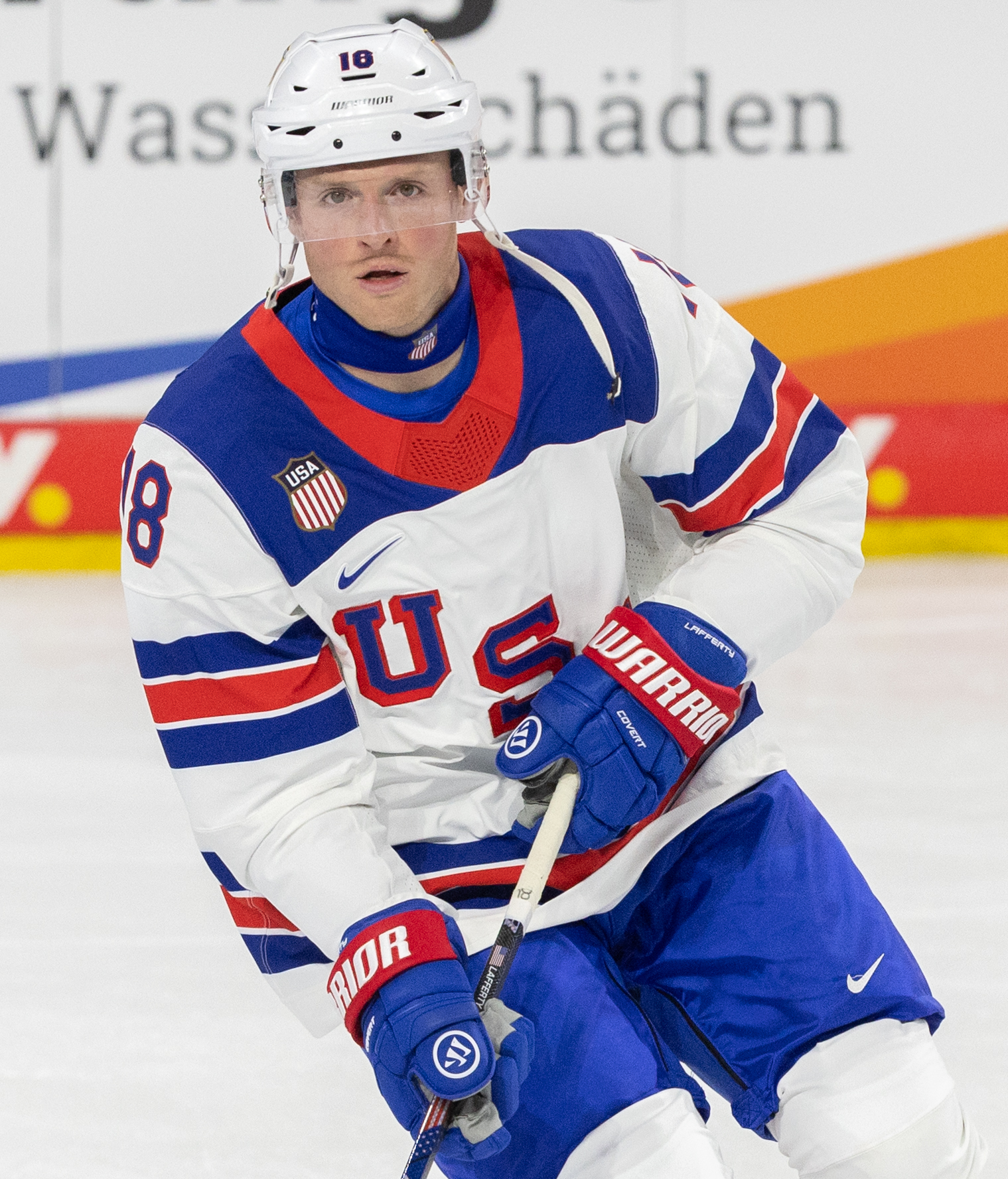
- Lafferty with Team USA in 2026
- Born: March 6, 1995 (age 31) Hollidaysburg, Pennsylvania, U.S.
- Height: 6 ft 2 in (188 cm)
- Weight: 205 lb (93 kg; 14 st 9 lb)
- Position: Center
- Shoots: Right
- NHL team Former teams: Florida Panthers; Pittsburgh Penguins; Chicago Blackhawks; Toronto Maple Leafs; Vancouver Canucks; Buffalo Sabres
- National team: United States
- NHL draft: 113th overall, 2014; Pittsburgh Penguins
- Playing career: 2018–present

Sam Lafferty (born March 6, 1995) is an American professional ice hockey player who is a center for the Florida Panthers of the National Hockey League (NHL). He has previously played with the Pittsburgh Penguins, Toronto Maple Leafs, Vancouver Canucks, Buffalo Sabres, and Chicago Blackhawks.

Born and raised in Hollidaysburg, Pennsylvania, Lafferty attended Hollidaysburg Area High School before a spot opened at Deerfield Academy in Massachusetts. During his time at Deerfield, Lafferty tallied 38 goals and 57 assists for a total of 95 points in 74 games. Following his graduation in 2014, Lafferty was drafted by the Penguins in the 2014 NHL entry draft and began his collegiate hockey career with the Brown Bears men's ice hockey team. Throughout his four seasons at Brown, Lafferty was selected for the All-ECAC Third Team and named to the Second and Third Team All-Ivy League. Lafferty concluded his collegiate career on March 7, 2018, and joined the Penguins organization.

== Early life ==
Lafferty was born on March 6, 1995, in Hollidaysburg, Pennsylvania to parents Jill and Andy. His parents later divorced and his mother re-married to Dave Weaver, who coached Lafferty growing up. He was inspired to begin playing hockey following the 2000–01 NHL season where Mario Lemieux returned to the Pittsburgh Penguins. After attending a skating clinic run by Dave, Lafferty and his younger brother Charlie played for the Mid-State Mustangs and the Altoona Trackers of the Pittsburgh Area Hockey League.

== Playing career ==
=== Amateur ===
Lafferty spent his freshman and most of his sophomore year at Hollidaysburg Area High School before applying to prep schools. He originally committed to attend Shady Side Academy before a spot opened at Deerfield Academy in Massachusetts. During the 2013–14 season, Lafferty tallied a career-best 21 goals and 34 assists for 55 points in 25 games and was named to the 2014 Prep School All-New England team. Over his three seasons with the Deerfield Academy, Lafferty tallied 38 goals and 57 assists for a total of 95 points in 74 games. Following his graduation in 2014, Lafferty was drafted by the Penguins in the 2014 NHL entry draft.

=== Collegiate ===
In spite of being drafted, Lafferty played four seasons of college hockey with the Brown Bears men's ice hockey team from 2014 to 2018. During his freshman season, Lafferty played in all 31 games and finished fourth on the team with eight assists and fifth with four goals. While playing hockey as a freshman, Lafferty also competed in Division I golf and qualified for the 2015 Ivy League Men's Golf Championship. The following year, Lafferty decreased offensively and finished the season with four goals and six assists for 10 points.

Lafferty returned to the Brown Bears for his junior season and experienced a breakout year. By January 2017, his eight goals and 19 assists ranked fourth in ECAC in scoring and third in points per game. He finished the season leading the Bears in scoring with 35 points in all 31 games played and ranked first on the team in assists. Lafferty also posted nine multiple-point games which included two four-point performances. At the conclusion of the season, Lafferty was selected for the All-ECAC Third Team and named to the Third Team All-Ivy League. He was also named Team MVP and selected as a semifinalist for the Walter Brown Award as the best American-born college hockey player in New England.

Lafferty's scoring prowess continued through his senior season as he recorded eight goals and 14 assists for 22 points. As a second-time assistant captain, he began the season being named one of 20 candidates for the 2017–18 Senior CLASS Award. Following this, Lafferty was named the ECAC Player of the Week in February after he recorded four points in two games to help Brown to sweep Harvard and Dartmouth. In the same month, Lafferty also scored his first collegiate hat-trick on February 23, 2018, against Harvard. He finished the 2017–18 season being selected for the Second Team All-Ivy and ECAC All-Academic Team.

=== Professional ===
On March 7, 2018, Lafferty concluded his collegiate career by signing an amateur tryout agreement with the Wilkes-Barre/Scranton Penguins of the American Hockey League (AHL) for the remainder of the 2017–18 season. He also signed a two-year, entry-level contract with the Pittsburgh Penguins of the National Hockey League (NHL) that began in the 2018–19 season. Upon joining Wilkes-Barre/Scranton, Lafferty recorded his first professional goal on April 3, 2018, against the Hershey Bears.

After attending Pittsburgh's 2018 training camp, he was re-assigned to their AHL affiliate in Wilkes-Barre/Scranton. In his first professional season, Lafferty scored 49 points in 70 games to become the teams' second-leading scorer. Lafferty made his NHL debut on October 8, 2019, in Pittsburgh's game against the Winnipeg Jets. Lafferty scored his first NHL goal and assist a few days later on October 12, 2019, in a 7–4 win over the Minnesota Wild.

On January 5, 2022, Lafferty was traded to the Chicago Blackhawks in exchange for Alexander Nylander.

During the following 2022–23 NHL season, while in the midst of breakout season in establishing new offensive highs, Lafferty was traded by the rebuilding Blackhawks to the Toronto Maple Leafs, along with Jake McCabe, and two future draft selections in exchange for Toronto's 2025 first-round pick (conditional), Toronto's second-round pick in 2026, Joey Anderson and Pavel Gogolev on February 27, 2023. He finished the season with 12 goals and 27 points in 70 games between the Blackhawks and the Maple Leafs. In the playoffs, Lafferty added a goal in nine games.

At the end of the Maple Leafs 2023 training camp, Lafferty was traded to the Vancouver Canucks for a fifth-round selection in the 2024 NHL entry draft on October 8, 2023.

On June 26, 2024, as a pending unrestricted free agent, the Canucks traded Lafferty back to the Blackhawks, alongside Ilya Mikheyev and a second-round pick in 2027, in exchange for a fourth-round pick in 2027. Unable to agree to terms with the Blackhawks, on July 1, 2024, Lafferty signed as a free agent to a two-year, $4 million contract with the Buffalo Sabres.

After just one season with the Sabres, having recorded career lows scoring output, Lafferty was traded in a return to the Chicago Blackhawks in exchange for a 2026 sixth-round pick on July 1, 2025.

As a free agent, Lafferty was signed to a one-year, two-way contract for the 2026–27 season with his sixth NHL club, the Florida Panthers, on July 1, 2026.

== Personal life ==
Lafferty is married to Madison Stillman, the daughter of former NHL player Cory Stillman and the sister of current NHL players Riley and Chase Stillman. The couple have a son together.

== Career statistics ==
=== Regular season and playoffs ===
			Regular season					Playoffs
Season	Team	League	GP	G	A	Pts	PIM	GP	G	A	Pts	PIM
2009–10	Hollidaysburg Area High	USHS	19	19	26	45	14	—	—	—	—	—
2010–11	Hollidaysburg Area High	USHS	18	34	35	69	26	—	—	—	—	—
2011–12	Deerfield Academy	USHS	25	8	8	16	4	—	—	—	—	—
2012–13	Deerfield Academy	USHS	24	9	15	24	6	—	—	—	—	—
2013–14	Deerfield Academy	USHS	25	21	34	55	14	—	—	—	—	—
2014–15	Brown University	ECAC	31	4	8	12	16	—	—	—	—	—
2015–16	Brown University	ECAC	31	4	6	10	4	—	—	—	—	—
2016–17	Brown University	ECAC	31	13	22	35	32	—	—	—	—	—
2017–18	Brown University	ECAC	31	8	14	22	34	—	—	—	—	—
2017–18	Wilkes-Barre/Scranton Penguins	AHL	9	1	2	3	4	—	—	—	—	—
2018–19	Wilkes-Barre/Scranton Penguins	AHL	70	13	36	49	94	—	—	—	—	—
2019–20	Wilkes-Barre/Scranton Penguins	AHL	6	3	0	3	10	—	—	—	—	—
2019–20	Pittsburgh Penguins	NHL	50	6	7	13	23	1	0	0	0	0
2020–21	Pittsburgh Penguins	NHL	34	0	6	6	25	—	—	—	—	—
2021–22	Pittsburgh Penguins	NHL	10	0	2	2	12	—	—	—	—	—
2021–22	Chicago Blackhawks	NHL	46	5	6	11	21	—	—	—	—	—
2022–23	Chicago Blackhawks	NHL	51	10	11	21	28	—	—	—	—	—
2022–23	Toronto Maple Leafs	NHL	19	2	4	6	9	9	1	2	3	2
2023–24	Vancouver Canucks	NHL	79	13	11	24	32	11	0	0	0	2
2024–25	Buffalo Sabres	NHL	60	4	3	7	28	—	—	—	—	—
2025–26	Chicago Blackhawks	NHL	29	1	1	2	14	—	—	—	—	—
NHL totals			378	41	51	92	192	21	1	2	3	4

=== International ===
Year	Team	Event	Result	GP	G	A	Pts	PIM
2022	United States	WC	4th	10	1	2	3	6
2026	United States	WC	8th	7	0	0	0	6
Senior totals				17	1	2	3	12

== Awards and honors ==
Award	Year
College
ECAC Third Team	2017
All-Ivy League Third Team	2017
All-Ivy League Second Team	2018
