= E. J. Speed =

American football player (born 1995)

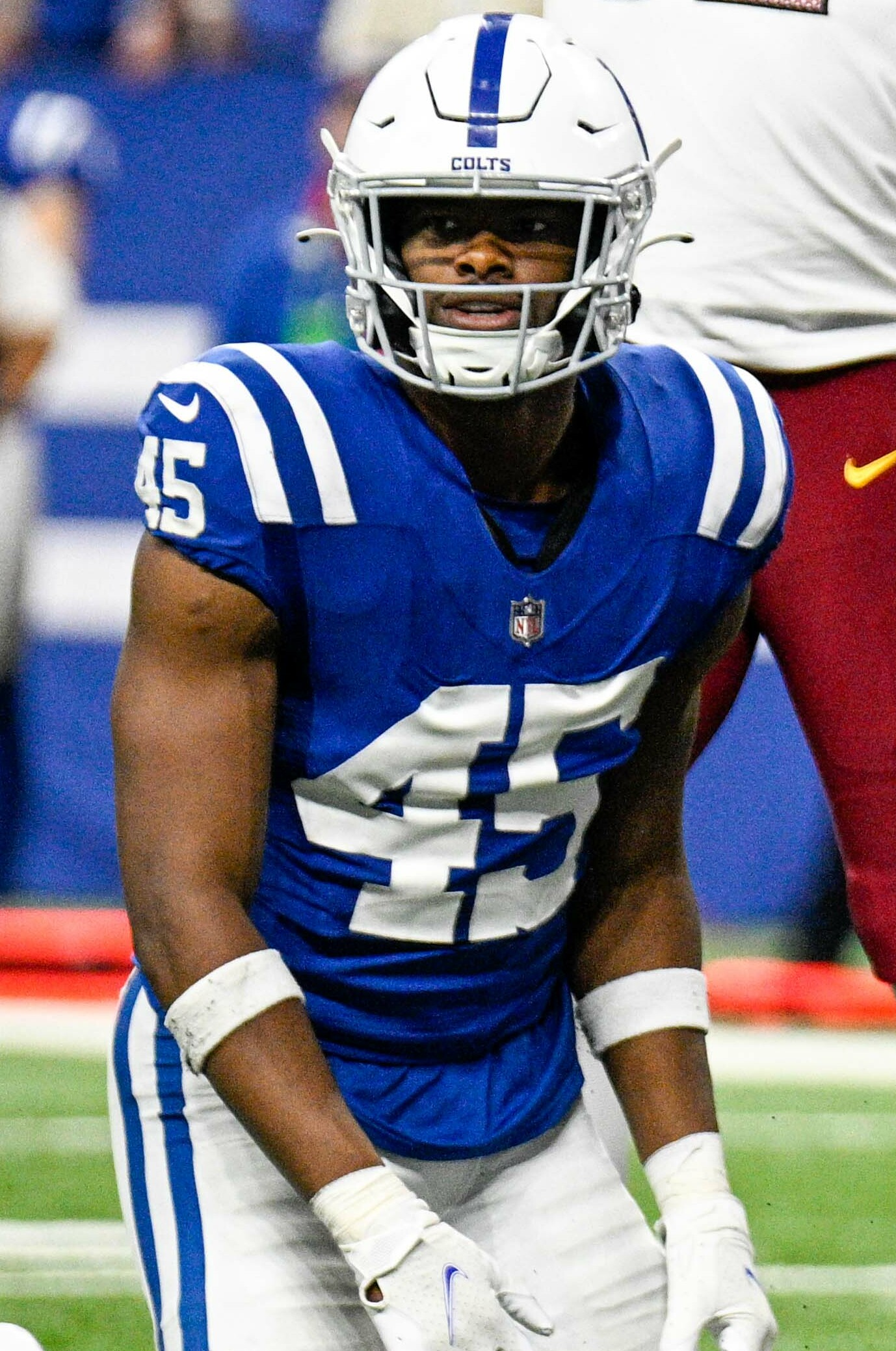
- Speed with the Indianapolis Colts in 2022

No. 45 – Houston Texans
- Position: Linebacker
- Roster status: Physically unable to perform

Personal information
- Born: June 1, 1995 (age 31); Fort Worth, Texas, U.S.
- Listed height: 6 ft 4 in (1.93 m)
- Listed weight: 227 lb (103 kg)

Career information
- High school: North Crowley (Fort Worth)
- College: Tarleton State (2013–2018)
- NFL draft: 2019: 5th round, 164th overall pick

Career history
- Indianapolis Colts (2019–2024); Houston Texans (2025–present)

Awards and highlights
- 2× Second-team All-LSC (2016, 2018)

Career NFL statistics as of 2025
- Total tackles: 416
- Sacks: 2
- Forced fumbles: 6
- Interceptions: 1
- Pass deflections: 13
- Touchdowns: 2
- Stats at Pro Football Reference

Elbert Martin "E. J." Speed (born June 1, 1995) is an American professional football linebacker for the Houston Texans of the National Football League (NFL). He played college football for the Tarleton State Texans.

== Early life ==
Speed grew up in Fort Worth, Texas and attended North Crowley High School. He played both quarterback and wide receiver for the Panthers football team and was named first-team All-District as a senior after passing for 3,000 yards, rushing for 350 yards, and catching 30 passes for 400 yards with two touchdowns.

Speed was ranked a two-star recruit by Rivals.com and was ranked one of the top 30 high school recruits in the state of Texas by Dave Campbell's Texas Football and received scholarship offers from Oklahoma State, Colorado, and Colorado State but he ultimately decided to play college football at NCAA Division II Tarleton State University in order to stay closer to his family after his stepbrother was diagnosed with cancer.

== College career ==
Speed played five seasons for the Tarleton State Texans, redshirting his sophomore season due to injury. He was recruited to play quarterback, but was converted to wide receiver before moving to linebacker after his redshirt season. He was forced to redshirt again the next season due to injury.

In his first season of playing time, Speed finished third on the team with 68 tackles, including 13 for loss, with six sacks and a Division II-high five forced fumbles and was named second-team All-Lone Star Conference (LSC). He only played in five games due to injury as a junior, with 41 total tackles (8.5 for loss).

As a senior, Speed recorded a career-high 106 tackles, 12.5 tackles for loss and 5 sacks and was again named second-team All-LSC. During this senior season, Speed was arrested and charged with two counts of organized criminal activity in relation to a credit card fraud scheme along with three other people. His case was ultimately dismissed after the charges were no-billed by a grand jury.

Speed finished his collegiate career with 231 tackles, 36 of which were for a loss, 11.5 sacks and eight forced fumbles.

== Professional career ==
Pre-draft measurables
| Height | Weight | Arm length | Hand span | Wingspan | 40-yard dash | 10-yard split | 20-yard split | 20-yard shuttle | Three-cone drill | Vertical jump | Broad jump | Bench press |
|---|---|---|---|---|---|---|---|---|---|---|---|---|
| 6 ft 4 in (1.93 m) | 224 lb (102 kg) | 33 1/4 in (0.84 m) | 9 3/4 in (0.25 m) | 6 ft 8 1/4 in (2.04 m) | 4.60 s | 1.58 s | 2.57 s | 4.39 s | 6.90 s | 34.0 in (0.86 m) | 10 ft 0 in (3.05 m) | 24 reps |
All values from Pro Day

=== Indianapolis Colts ===
Speed was drafted by the Indianapolis Colts in the fifth round, 164th overall, of the 2019 NFL draft. He signed a rookie contract with the team on May 3, 2019. Notably, he posted an unimpressive 4.60 in the 40-yard dash, despite his name. Speed made his NFL debut on September 15, 2019 in a 19–17 win over the Tennessee Titans. He finished his rookie season with seven total tackles in 12 games played.

On November 12, 2020, against the Titans on Thursday Night Football, Speed blocked a punt from Trevor Daniel that was picked up and taken into the end zone for a touchdown by teammate T. J. Carrie and was named the American Football Conference (AFC) Special Teams Player of the Week for Week 10.

In Week 10 of the 2021 season, Speed returned a blocked punt 12 yards for a touchdown in a 23–17 win over the Jacksonville Jaguars, earning AFC Special Teams Player of the Week. In Week 15, Speed scored on another blocked punt when he recovered the ball in the end zone in a 27–17 win over the New England Patriots.

On March 15, 2023, Speed signed a two-year, $8 million contract extension with the Colts.

In 2023, Speed played in 16 games with 11 starts, finishing second on the team with 102 tackles, one sack, four passes defensed, and three forced fumbles.

=== Houston Texans ===
On March 29, 2025, Speed signed a one-year, $5 million contract with the Houston Texans. He played in 16 games (including nine starts) for the Texans, recording 62 tackle and one pass deflection.

On March 10, 2026, Speed signed a two-year, $13 million contract extension with the Texans. On May 22, it was reported that Speed had suffered a partially torn quadriceps muscle while lifting weights.

== NFL career statistics ==
Legend
| **Bold** | Career high |

=== Regular season ===
| Year | Team | Games | | Tackles | | | | | Interceptions | | | | | | Fumbles | | | | |
| Year | Team | GP | GS | Cmb | Solo | Ast | Sck | TFL | Int | Yds | Avg | Lng | TD | PD | FF | Fum | FR | Yds | TD |
|---|---|---|---|---|---|---|---|---|---|---|---|---|---|---|---|---|---|---|---|
| 2019 | IND | 12 | 0 | 7 | 4 | 3 | 0.0 | 1 | 0 | 0 | 0.0 | 0 | 0 | 0 | 0 | 0 | 0 | 0 | 0 |
| 2020 | IND | 15 | 0 | 9 | 7 | 2 | 0.0 | 0 | 0 | 0 | 0.0 | 0 | 0 | 0 | 0 | 0 | 0 | 0 | 0 |
| 2021 | IND | **17** | 1 | 31 | 23 | 8 | 0.0 | 0 | 0 | 0 | 0.0 | 0 | 0 | 1 | 1 | 0 | 0 | 0 | 0 |
| 2022 | IND | **17** | 5 | 63 | 37 | 26 | **1.0** | 7 | 0 | 0 | 0.0 | 0 | 0 | 2 | 2 | 0 | 0 | 0 | 0 |
| 2023 | IND | 16 | 11 | 102 | 78 | 24 | **1.0** | **12** | 0 | 0 | 0.0 | 0 | 0 | 4 | **3** | 0 | 0 | 0 | 0 |
| 2024 | IND | 15 | **15** | **142** | **93** | **49** | 0.0 | 7 | **1** | **12** | **12.0** | **12** | 0 | **5** | 0 | 0 | 0 | 0 | 0 |
| 2025 | HOU | 16 | 9 | 62 | 33 | 29 | 0.0 | 2 | 0 | 0 | 0.0 | 0 | 0 | 1 | 0 | 0 | 0 | 0 | 0 |
| Career | | 108 | 41 | 416 | 275 | 141 | 2.0 | 29 | 1 | 12 | 12.0 | 12 | 0 | 13 | 6 | 0 | 0 | 0 | 0 |

=== Postseason ===
| Year | Team | Games | | Tackles | | | | | Interceptions | | | | | | Fumbles | | | | |
| Year | Team | GP | GS | Cmb | Solo | Ast | Sck | TFL | Int | Yds | Avg | Lng | TD | PD | FF | Fum | FR | Yds | TD |
|---|---|---|---|---|---|---|---|---|---|---|---|---|---|---|---|---|---|---|---|
| 2020 | IND | 1 | 0 | 1 | 1 | 0 | 0.0 | 0 | 0 | 0 | 0.0 | 0 | 0 | 0 | 0 | 0 | 0 | 0 | 0 |
| 2025 | HOU | **2** | 0 | **3** | **2** | **1** | 0.0 | **1** | 0 | 0 | 0.0 | 0 | 0 | 0 | 0 | 0 | 0 | 0 | 0 |
| Career | | 3 | 0 | 4 | 3 | 1 | 0.0 | 1 | 0 | 0 | 0.0 | 0 | 0 | 0 | 0 | 0 | 0 | 0 | 0 |
