= Hollidaysburg Area High School =

Coordinates: 40.4418°N 78.3996°W

Hollidaysburg Area Senior High School

Location
- 1510 North Montgomery Street; Hollidaysburg, Blair County, Pennsylvania 16648; United States

Information
- School type: Public
- Established: 1877
- School district: Hollidaysburg Area School District
- Principal: Breanne Venios
- Staff: 57.05 (FTE)
- Grades: 10–12
- Enrollment: 803 (2023-2024)
- Student to teacher ratio: 14.08
- Colors: Navy, Gold, and White
- Mascot: Golden Tiger
- Website: sh.hasdtigers.com

Hollidaysburg Area Senior High School is the midsized, suburban public high school for the Hollidaysburg Area School District. The Senior High School is located at 1510 North Montgomery Street in Hollidaysburg, Blair County. The high school serves the populations living in Hollidaysburg, Duncansville, Newry, and a small portion of Altoona (Eldorado).

According to the National Center for Education Statistics, this high school reported an enrollment of 803 pupils in grades 10 through 12 during the 2021–2022 academic year.

== History ==
The original Senior High was located on the second floor of a business building at 308 Allegheny Street before eventually moving to 1000 Hewitt Street, where the current junior high is today. Prior to 1956, elementary schools in the district included seventh and eighth grades. Overcrowding in Frankstown and Duncansville led to a joint decision by the school board and the department of Public Instruction to approve an addition to the senior high, which became the new junior high school. The junior and senior high schools co-existed and brought relief to the elementary schools when the seventh and eighth grade classes were transferred; however, the increasing student population did not halt. As a result, a new Senior High was approved during the 1960s.

The existing junior-senior high building was then converted to a junior high school, which remains today. The present-day senior high includes tenth, eleventh and twelfth grades and is located on North Montgomery St. while the Junior High still exists at its prior location.

The senior high school launched a renovation project with construction starting in January 2009. The renovations include a new gymnasium and more classrooms. The school will also have a new geo-thermal heating system along with the traditional gas system.

In 2021, the school was recognized as a 2021 National Blue Ribbon School.

Building Features

The inside of the school contains a gymnasium, swimming pool, planetarium, and auditorium. Outside the school are a baseball field, baseball practice facility, cross-country course, and soccer field. The school also has a band practice field and an amphitheater.

== Students ==
Ethnicity	Hollidaysburg	State Average
White	92.2%	66.4%
Asian	2.6%	4.7%
Hispanic	2.2%	14.9%
Two or More Races	2.1%	5.3%
Black	0.9%	14.4%

== Extracurriculars ==
The district offers an extensive variety of clubs, activities and many sports.

=== Clubs and organizations ===
Hollidaysburg Area Senior High School offers a variety of clubs and organizations to its students. The clubs include: Marching Band, TigerPaws (Dance team), Fantazia (Choir), Concert Choir, Orchestra, Concert Band, Jazz Band, Symphonic Wind Ensemble (SWE), Experimental Jazz (E-Jazz), Chimrock (School Yearbook), FBLA (Future Business Leaders of America), Foreign Language Clubs (French, German, Spanish), Tiger TV, HARP (Hollidaysburg Area Repertory Players, the school's drama club), Key Club, SADD (Students Against Destructive Decisions), Peer Tutoring, Recycling Club, TAAD (Tigers Against Alcohol and other Drugs), Scholastic Quiz Team, History Club, STEM Club, NHS (National Honor Society), Student Council, and Prom Committee.

=== Sports ===
The District funds:

Boys:
- Baseball - AAAAA
- Basketball - AAAAA
- Cross Country - AAA
- Football - AAAAA
- Golf - AAA
- Soccer - AAA
- Swimming and Diving - AAA
- Tennis - AAA
- Track and Field - AAA
- Wrestling - AAA
Girls:
- Basketball - AAAAA
- Cross Country - AAA
- Golf - AAA
- Soccer (Fall) - AAA
- Softball - AAAAA
- Swimming and Diving - AA
- Girls' Tennis - AAA
- Track and Field - AAA
- Volleyball - AAA

== Athletics ==
The School also recognizes a club hockey team, which competes in the Laurel Mountain Hockey League (LMHL). The team currently supports a varsity team, JV Team and freshman (junior high) team, as well as several elementary teams. The football and soccer teams (select games only) play their games at Tiger Stadium, which is located between the junior and senior high schools, while the hockey team plays at Galactic Ice in Altoona.

=== Football ===
The program currently competes in class AAAAA of the PIAA and is independent. The first season was in 1920 and the team had a 4–2 record under George Carl. The program today has five hundred and eighty wins. The team has won ten District Championships: five under head coach Harold Price (1985, 1989, 1990, 1993, 1995), three under current head coach John Barton (1999, 2006, 2008) and three under head coach Homer DeLattre (2017, 2018, 2020, 2021, 2023, 2024, 2025). Homer DeLattre also lead the tigers to two state quarterfinals in 2024 and 2025.

Construction began in the spring of 2004 on a new artificial turf to replace the existing grass field. The new field provided the opportunity for other sports and events to use the facility as well. Two renovated concession stands and an information kiosk were also completed. Tiger Stadium is being updated by the restore the roar project. This project includes new turf, fixed lighting, new fencing, and the addition of field houses for home and away teams.

Record since 1998

Coach	Year	Wins	Losses
Phil Ricco	1998	5	6
John Barton	1999	11	2
John Barton	2000	7	4
John Barton	2001	4	7
John Barton	2002	8	3
John Barton	2003	6	5
John Barton	2004	4	5
John Barton	2005	3	7
John Barton	2006	8	5
John Barton	2007	9	3
John Barton	2008	10	2
John Barton	2009	4	7
John Barton	2010	6	4
John Barton	2011	3	5
John Barton	2012	3	7
Homer DeLattre	2013	3	7
Homer DeLattre	2014	4	5
Homer DeLattre	2015	6	4
Homer DeLattre	2016	6	5
Homer DeLattre	2017	8	4
Homer DeLattre	2018	9	5
Homer DeLattre	2019	6	5
Homer DeLattre	2020	4	4
Homer DeLattre	2021	6	5
Homer DeLattre	2022	2	8
Homer DeLattre	2023	5	6
Homer DeLattre	2024	13	1
Homer DeLattre	2025	13	1

=== Basketball ===
The men's basketball team competes in Class AAAAA while women's basketball competes in Class AAAAA in the PIAA. Both also right now have no conference, but continue to play perennial rivals Altoona and State College. Brad Lear coaches the men while Deanna Jubeck coaches the women. The mens team has 7 AAAAA (5A) titles in 2017, 2018, 2021, 2022, 2023, 2024, 2025; 6 AAAA (4A) titles in 1989, 19999, 2000, 2006, 2010, 2012; and 3 AAA (3A) titles in 1931, 2011, 2012, 2016.

Men
Year	Wins	Losses
2006-07	15	9
2007-08	10	16
2008-09	14	10
2009-10	16	9
2010-11	19	3
2011-12	8	13
2012-13	8	18
2013-14	6	15
2014-15	16	8
2015-16	21	5
2016-17	16	8
2017-18	16	8
2018-19	11	11
2019-20	14	9
2020-21	2	15
2021-22	10	13
2022-23	10	12
2023-24	19	5
2024-25	21	4
2025-26	18	5

Women
Year	Wins	Losses
2006-07	15	9
2007-08	20	4
2008-09	13	10
2009-10	13	10
2010-11	21	5
2011-12	15	10
2012-13	22	3
2013-14	18	10

=== Soccer ===
The men's and women's soccer team rank AAA, the highest ranking for soccer. Both teams compete in District 6, which the women won in 2005 and 2007. The 2005 men's team beat #3 ranked State College 1-0 to win the District 6 Championship. The 2005 women's team also set a district six record, becoming the first team from the district to make it to the State semi-finals. The men are coached by Craig Shale while Dave Soellner finished 2008 as his first for the Lady Tigers.

Men's 2008 Record
Wins	Losses	Ties
15	9	1

Girls 2008 Record
Wins	Losses	Ties
14	5	0

== Notable alumni ==
- Jeff Bower - Head Coach, Men's Basketball, Marist College
- Charlie Brenneman (class of 1999) - wrestler; professional MMA fighter, formerly in the UFC's Lightweight Division
- Billy Clapper (class of 2001) - Head Coach, Men's Basketball, Penn State Altoona
- Sam Lafferty (2009-2011) - NHL forward
- Karen Davis (class of 1962) - animal rights advocate
- Wade Schalles - member of the National Wrestling Hall of Fame
- Judy Ward - Member, Pennsylvania State Senate
- Luke Rhodes - Professional football player, Indianapolis Colts
- Jim Fall - Film director, The Lizzie McGuire Movie
- Andrea Verobish - Member, Pennsylvania State House of Representatives
- Adam Sheetz (class of 2001) - President and COO of Sheetz Corporation (effective January 2027)
