= Ashton Dulin =

American football player (born 1997)

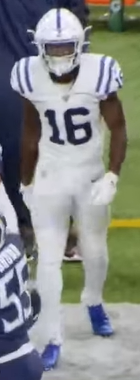
- Dulin with the Indianapolis Colts in 2019

No. 16 – Indianapolis Colts
- Positions: Wide receiver, kickoff returner
- Roster status: Active

Personal information
- Born: May 15, 1997 (age 29); Elkhart, Indiana, U.S.
- Listed height: 6 ft 2 in (1.88 m)
- Listed weight: 215 lb (98 kg)

Career information
- High school: Reynoldsburg
- College: Malone (2015–2018)
- NFL draft: 2019: undrafted

Career history
- Indianapolis Colts (2019–present)

Awards and highlights
- Second-team All-Pro (2021); 2× First-team All-G-MAC (2017, 2018)

Career NFL statistics as of 2025
- Receptions: 40
- Receiving yards: 623
- Receiving touchdowns: 4
- Return yards: 915
- Rushing yards: 140
- Stats at Pro Football Reference

Ashton Dulin (born May 15, 1997) is an American professional football wide receiver and kickoff returner for the Indianapolis Colts of the National Football League (NFL). He played college football for the Malone Pioneers.

== Early life ==
Born in Elkhart, Indiana, Dulin grew up in Reynoldsburg, Ohio and attended Reynoldsburg High School, where he was a member of the football and track teams. He was named first-team All-Ohio at free safety as a senior. Dulin committed to play college football and run track at Malone University over an offer from Ashland.

== College career ==
Dulin was a four-year starter for the Malone Pioneers. He was named first-team All-Great Midwest Athletic Conference (G-MAC) in his junior season after recording 59 receptions for 1,050 yards and 10 touchdowns. As a senior, the final season of Malone's football team before it was discontinued, Dulin was again named first-team All-G-MAC and both the conference Offensive and Special Teams Player of the Year after catching 61 passes for 984 yards and 11 touchdowns, rushing for 120 yards and a touchdown on 13 carries and returning 28 kickoffs for 836 yards and three touchdowns. He finished his collegiate career with 189 receptions for 3,188 yards and 28 touchdowns while also rushing for 387 yards and three touchdowns on 53 carries.

In track, Dulin set conference records in the 100 meter, the 110 meter hurdles, the 200 meters, the 400 meter hurdles and the long jump. Dulin was named the G-MAC indoor track athlete of the year and a Division II All-American in the 60 meter hurdles as a junior.

== Professional career ==
Pre-draft measurables
Height	Weight	Arm length	Hand span	Wingspan	40-yard dash	10-yard split	20-yard split	20-yard shuttle	Three-cone drill	Vertical jump	Broad jump	Bench press
6 ft 1 3/8 in (1.86 m)	215 lb (98 kg)	33 3/8 in (0.85 m)	9 in (0.23 m)	6 ft 5 1/4 in (1.96 m)	4.43 s	1.52 s	2.61 s	4.22 s	6.81 s	38.0 in (0.97 m)	10 ft 1 in (3.07 m)	13 reps
All values from NFL Combine/Pro Day

Dulin signed with the Indianapolis Colts as an undrafted free agent on April 27, 2019. He was cut by Colts on August 31, but was re-signed to the team's practice squad the following day. Dulin was promoted to the Colts' active roster on September 27. He made his NFL debut on September 29, against the Oakland Raiders, making a tackle on special teams and becoming the first and only Malone football player to appear in an NFL game. Dulin caught a 13-yard pass from Jacoby Brissett for his first career reception on December 1. In his rookie season Dulin played in 13 games with two receptions for 17 yards, three kickoff returns for 90 yards and six tackles on special teams.

Dulin made the Colts 53-man roster to start the 2020 season. He was placed on injured reserve on November 7, 2020. Dulin was activated on November 28. On January 10, 2021, Dulin signed a one-year extension with the Colts.

In 2021, Dulin saw action in all 17 games (one start) and finished second in the NFL with 17 special teams tackles. He also set career highs in receptions (13), receiving yards (173) and receiving touchdowns (two). Since entering the NFL in 2019, Dulin ranks 11th in the league in special teams tackles (31). He was named Associated Press (AP) second-team All-Pro for the first time in his career. It marked the second consecutive season Indianapolis has had a special teams player named AP All-Pro as safety George Odum was a First-team All-Pro choice in 2020.

On October 11, 2022, Dulin was placed on injured reserve. He was designated to return from injured reserve on November 9, and activated for Week 10.

On March 20, 2023, Dulin re-signed with the Colts. He suffered a torn ACL in training camp and was placed on injured reserve on August 17.

On March 12, 2025, Dulin re-signed with the Colts on a two-year, $6.5 million contract. In 10 appearances for the team, he recorded five receptions for 106 yards. On November 25, Dulin was placed on injured reserve due to a hamstring injury suffered in Week 12 against the Kansas City Chiefs. He was activated on December 27, ahead of the team's Week 17 matchup against the Jacksonville Jaguars.
