= Luke Rhodes =

American football player (born 1992)

No. 46 – Indianapolis Colts
- Position: Long snapper
- Roster status: Active

Personal information
- Born: December 2, 1992 (age 33); Hollidaysburg, Pennsylvania, U.S.
- Listed height: 6 ft 2 in (1.88 m)
- Listed weight: 238 lb (108 kg)

Career information
- High school: Hollidaysburg
- College: William & Mary (2011–2015)
- NFL draft: 2016: undrafted

Career history
- Tampa Bay Buccaneers (2016)*; Indianapolis Colts (2016–present)
- * Offseason or practice squad member only

Awards and highlights
- First-team All-Pro (2021); Second-team All-Pro (2020); Pro Bowl (2021)

Career NFL statistics as of Week 8, 2026
- Games played: 160
- Tackles: 19
- Stats at Pro Football Reference

Luke Rhodes (born December 2, 1992) is an American professional football long snapper and linebacker for the Indianapolis Colts of the National Football League (NFL). He played college football for the William & Mary Tribe.

== College career ==
Rhodes attended the College of William & Mary in Williamsburg, Virginia, where he was a linebacker for the William & Mary Tribe. He was given a redshirt for the 2011 season before starting nine times for William & Mary as a redshirt freshman in 2012.

Rhodes ultimately started in 45 of 47 games for the Tribe and ended his collegiate career with 341 tackles (172 solo), five sacks, one interception, six forced fumbles, and two fumble recoveries.

Rhodes was selected three times to the All-Colonial Athletic Association First Team and was the only Division I-AA player named to the watch list for the 2015 Butkus Award.

== Professional career ==
Pre-draft measurables
Height	Weight	Arm length	Hand span	Wingspan	40-yard dash	10-yard split	20-yard split	20-yard shuttle	Three-cone drill	Vertical jump	Broad jump	Bench press
6 ft 1 5/8 in (1.87 m)	236 lb (107 kg)	29 7/8 in (0.76 m)	10 1/8 in (0.26 m)	6 ft 2 7/8 in (1.90 m)	4.73 s	1.63 s	2.76 s	4.32 s	7.13 s	35.0 in (0.89 m)	9 ft 10 in (3.00 m)	29 reps
All values from Pro Day

=== Tampa Bay Buccaneers ===
Rhodes signed with the Tampa Bay Buccaneers as an undrafted free agent on May 2, 2016. He was released on September 3, 2016 as part of final roster cuts.

=== Indianapolis Colts ===
On October 5, 2016, Rhodes was signed to the practice squad of the Indianapolis Colts. He was promoted to the active roster on December 7, 2016, where he was listed on the roster as a linebacker, participating mainly on special teams.

During the off-season, the Colts converted Rhodes to a new position, that of long snapper for punts and kickoffs. Rhodes successfully adapted to his new role and on August 28, 2017, was named the Colts' full-time long snapper after winning a training camp competition against rookie Thomas Hennessy.

On April 2, 2018, Rhodes signed an exclusive rights tender with the Colts through the 2018 season.

On June 11, 2019, Rhodes signed a four-year, $4.85 million contract extension with the Colts with $1.25 million guaranteed, making him the highest-paid long snapper in the league. He went on to be named an Associated Press (AP) Second-team All-Pro choice in 2020 and 2021.

In 2021, Rhodes handled long snapping duties in 16 games for the fifth consecutive season. He was named AP First-team All-Pro. Rhodes also became the first Indianapolis long snapper named to the Pro Bowl since Matt Overton in 2013.

On September 8, 2023, Rhodes signed a four-year, $6.465 million contract extension with the Colts, once again making him the highest-paid long snapper in the league.
