= Hydrocodone/paracetamol =

Combination pain relief drug

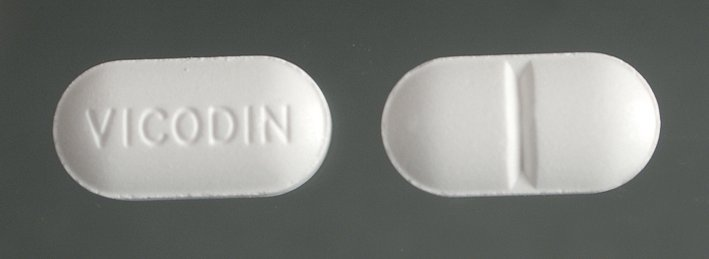

Combination of
- Hydrocodone: Opioid analgesic
- Paracetamol: Anilide analgesic

Clinical data
- Trade names: Lorcet, Norco, Vicodin, others
- Other names: Hydrocodone/acetaminophen, hydrocodone/APAP
- AHFS/Drugs.com: Professional Drug Facts
- License data: US DailyMed: Hydrocodone bitartrate and acetaminophen
- Routes of administration: By mouth
- ATC code: N02AJ22 (WHO)

Legal status
- Legal status: US: Schedule II

Pharmacokinetic data
- Bioavailability: >80%
- Metabolism: Hydrocodone: extensively liver, primarily CYP3A4; /Paracetamol: liver, CYP2E1
- Elimination half-life: for hydrocodone: 228–294 mins (3.8–4.9 hrs); for paracetamol: 120–240 mins (2–4 hrs)
- Excretion: for hydrocodone: urinary; for paracetamol: urinary (10–15% unchanged)

Identifiers
- CAS Number: 330988-71-1
- PubChem CID: 11247932
- ChemSpider: 9422965
- CompTox Dashboard (EPA): DTXSID301027135

Hydrocodone/paracetamol (also known as hydrocodone/acetaminophen) is the combination of the pain medications hydrocodone (an opioid) and paracetamol (acetaminophen). It is used to treat moderate to severe pain. It is taken by mouth. Recreational use is common in the United States.

Common side effects include dizziness, sleepiness, constipation, and vomiting. Serious side effects include addiction, decreased rate of breathing, low blood pressure, severe allergic reactions, and liver failure. Use during pregnancy may harm the fetus. Use with alcohol is not recommended. Hydrocodone works by binding to the mu-opioid receptor. How paracetamol works is unclear but may involve blocking the creation of prostaglandins.

Hydrocodone/paracetamol was approved for medical use in the United States in 1982. In the United States, it is a schedule II controlled substance. In 2023, it was the 25th most commonly prescribed medication in the United States, with more than 21 million prescriptions. It is not available in the United Kingdom, though the combination codeine/paracetamol (co-codamol) is. It is sold under the brand names Vicodin and Norco among others.

== Uses ==
=== Medical ===
Hydrocodone/paracetamol is a fixed-dose combination consisting of the opioid hydrocodone and the non-opioid analgesic paracetamol. It is indicated for relief of moderate to severe pain of acute, chronic, or postoperative types. Hydrocodone/paracetamol comes in oral solution and tablet formulations; however strength of each component may vary. In October 2014, the Drug Enforcement Administration rescheduled hydrocodone combination drugs from schedule III, to schedule II due to its risk for misuse, abuse, and diversions.

=== Recreational ===
Hydrocodone diversion and recreational use have escalated due to its opioid effects. In 2009 and 2010, hydrocodone was the second most frequently encountered opioid in the pharmaceutical industry. In-drug evidence was submitted to U.S. federal state and local forensic laboratories as reported by the Drug Enforcement Administration's National Forensic Laboratory Information System (NFLIS) and System to Retrieve Information from Drug Evidence (STRIDE).

=== Pregnancy and breastfeeding ===
Prolonged use of hydrocodone/paracetamol during pregnancy can result in neonatal opioid withdrawal syndrome. Hydrocodone/paracetamol passes into breast milk and may harm the baby.

=== Kidney and liver impairment ===
There is a possible risk of toxicity.

== Side effects ==
Main side effects of Vicodin

=== Most common ===
- Lightheadedness
- Dizziness
- Sedation
- Nausea and vomiting
- Headaches

=== Less common ===
- Central nervous system: drowsiness, confusion, lethargy, anxiety, fear, unease, dependence, mood changes, impairment of mental and physical performance
- Gastrointestinal system: constipation
- Genitourinary system: inability to urinate, bladder spasms
- Respiratory depression: decreased rate and effort of breathing
- Hearing impairment, permanent hearing loss
- Dermatological: rash, itching

=== Boxed warning ===
"Paracetamol has been associated with cases of acute liver failure, at times resulting in liver transplant and death. Most of the cases of liver injury are associated with the use of paracetamol at doses that exceed 4000 milligrams per day, and often involve more than one paracetamol-containing product."

In the US, the label for hydrocodone/paracetamol contains a boxed warning about addiction, abuse, and misuse.

== Overdose ==
Hydrocodone: Respiratory depression, extreme somnolence progressing towards coma, muscle limpness, cold and clammy skin, slow heart rate, low blood pressure, abrupt loss of heart function, and death may occur.

Paracetamol: Liver and kidney failure, low blood sugar, and coma may occur.

== Interactions ==
Hydrocodone may demonstrate an enhanced respiratory depressant effect when combined with other sedatives such as other opioids, benzodiazepines, nonbenzodiazepine sedatives, psychotropics, and anticonvulsants.

Concurrent use of paracetamol with alcohol products may increase the risk of acute liver failure.

== Pharmacology ==
=== Hydrocodone ===
- Mechanism of action: Hydrocodone acts primarily as an agonist at the mu-opioid receptors, but is also a weak agonist against the delta opioid and kappa opioid receptors.
- Absorption/distribution: The oral formulation can be absorbed from the gastrointestinal tract and remain 20–50% bound to plasma proteins. The onset of analgesia is about 20 to 30 minutes with a duration of 4 to 8 hours and t_{1/2} of 3 to 4 hours. Maximum serum levels are achieved at 1.3 hours.
- Metabolism/excretion: It is metabolized to norhydrocodone by cytochrome P450 3A4 and to hydromorphone, also biologically active, by cytochrome P450 2D6. For individuals who have a defect in the gene encoding CYP2D6, the clearance of the drug will be lower and less metabolite such as hydromorphone will be formed; however, the effect on analgesia remains unknown.
- Metabolites: Hydromorphone, the major active metabolite, has a 10-33-fold higher binding affinity for the mu-opioid receptor than hydrocodone. It may be up to >100-fold higher in some patients.

=== Paracetamol ===
- Mechanism of action: Paracetamol acts to inhibit COX enzyme, which is responsible for prostaglandin synthesis. Prostaglandins increase the perception of pain. Inhibition of prostaglandin production helps to alleviate pain.
- Absorption/distribution: The half-life of oral paracetamol is 1.25 to 3 hours and peak level is reached by 10–60 minutes after ingestion.
- Metabolism/excretion: Paracetamol is metabolized primarily in the liver via glucuronidation and sulfation to mostly non-toxic metabolites and some highly reactive metabolites, which is inactivated by glutathione. 85% of the oral dose is excreted via the kidneys. At high doses, the supply of glutathione cannot meet its demand, thus resulting in the accumulation of highly reactive compounds leading to liver damage.

== Society and culture ==
=== Legal status ===
In June 2009, a US Food and Drug Administration (FDA) advisory panel voted by a narrow margin to advise the FDA to remove Vicodin and another opioid, Percocet, from the market because of "a high likelihood of overdose from prescription narcotics and acetaminophen products". The panel also cited concerns of liver damage from their paracetamol component, which is also the main ingredient in commonly used nonprescription drugs such as Tylenol. Each year, paracetamol overdose is linked to about 400 deaths and 42,000 hospitalizations.

In January 2011, the FDA asked manufacturers of prescription combination products that contain paracetamol to limit the amount of paracetamol to no more than 325 mg in each tablet or capsule within three years. The FDA also required manufacturers on all paracetamol-containing products to issue a black box warning indicating the potential risk for severe liver injury and a warning highlighting potential for allergic reactions.

In August 2014, the Drug Enforcement Administration (DEA) announced that all hydrocodone combination products (HCPs) would be rescheduled from schedule III to schedule II of the Controlled Substances Act (CSA), effective in October 2014. In 2010, more than 16,000 deaths were attributed to abuse of opioid drugs. Even though there are legitimate medical uses for hydrocodone combination products, data suggest that a significant number of individuals misuse them.

=== Popular culture ===
Actor Matthew Perry struggled with his addiction to Vicodin for many years after a jet ski accident in 1997.

In May 2017, professional golfer Tiger Woods was arrested by the police for driving under the influence. Woods said that this was due to four prescription drugs that he was taking for a back operation, one of which was Vicodin.

Gregory House, the main protagonist of House, constantly carries Vicodin with him and often takes it to relieve his leg pain, something that plays a major role throughout the series.

=== Brand names ===
Brand names include Adol, Hycet, Lortab, Lorcet, Norco, and Vicodin among others.
