= Stride =

Stride or STRIDE may refer to:

== Computing ==
- STRIDE model, used for threat modeling
- Stride (software), a successor to the cloud-based HipChat, a corporate cloud-based collaboration tool
- Stride (game engine), a free and open-source 2D and 3D cross-platform game engine
- STRIDE (algorithm), an algorithm for identifying secondary structures in proteins
- Stride of an array, in computer programming
- Stride scheduling, a soft real-time scheduling algorithm
- System to Retrieve Information from Drug Evidence, a United States Drug Enforcement Administration database used to track the prices of drugs obtained in sting operations

== Music ==
- Stride (composition), a 2019 orchestral composition by Tania León
- Stride (music), a type of piano playing
- "Stride", a song by Avail from their 1992 album Satiate
- "Stride," a song by Canadian musician Hayden from his 1996 EP Moving Careful

== People ==
- Stride (surname)

== Other uses ==
- Stride (bus rapid transit), a bus rapid transit system in the Seattle area
- Stride (gum), a chewing gum produced by Mondelez International
- Stride Rite Corporation, a footwear company
- Strides, a British & Australian slang term for trousers
- Strides Pharma, a pharmaceutical company headquartered in India
- Stride, Inc., formerly K12, an online education company
