= Nyheim Miller-Hines =

American football player (born 1996)

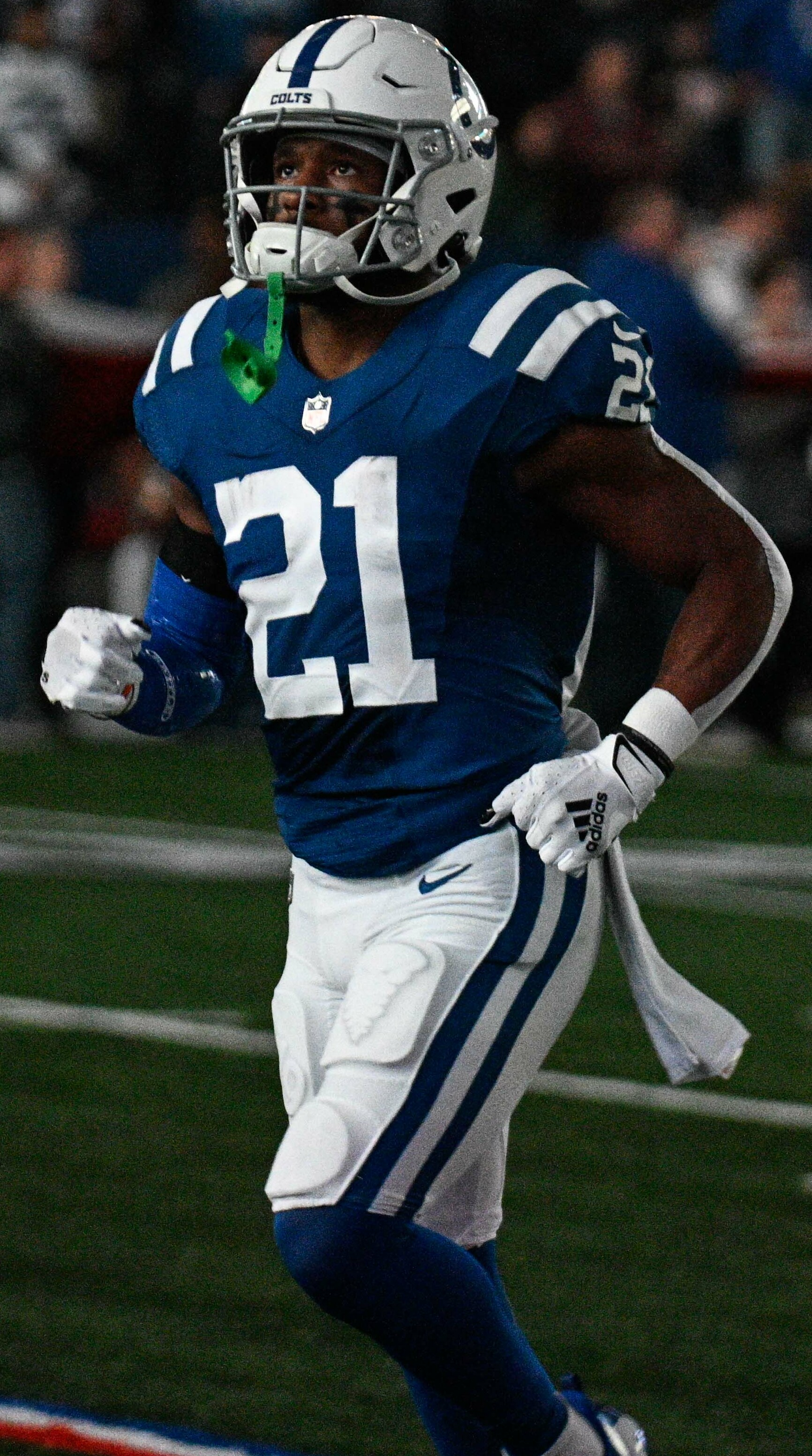
- Hines with the Indianapolis Colts in 2022

Profile
- Position: Running back / punt returner

Personal information
- Born: November 12, 1996 (age 29); Garner, North Carolina, U.S.
- Listed height: 5 ft 8 in (1.73 m)
- Listed weight: 198 lb (90 kg)

Career information
- High school: Garner
- College: NC State (2015–2017)
- NFL draft: 2018: 4th round, 104th overall pick

Career history
- Indianapolis Colts (2018–2022); Buffalo Bills (2022–2023); Cleveland Browns (2024); Los Angeles Chargers (2025); New Orleans Saints (2025)

Awards and highlights
- First team All-ACC (2017)

Career NFL statistics as of 2025
- Rushing yards: 1,202
- Rushing average: 3.9
- Rushing touchdowns: 10
- Receptions: 240
- Receiving yards: 1,778
- Receiving touchdowns: 8
- Return yards: 1,832
- Return touchdowns: 4
- Stats at Pro Football Reference

Nyheim Arthur Miller-Hines (/nɑːˈhim/ nah-HEEM; born November 12, 1996) is an American professional football running back. He played college football for the NC State Wolfpack, and was selected by the Indianapolis Colts in the fourth round of the 2018 NFL draft.

== Early life ==
Miller-Hines attended Garner Magnet High School in Garner, North Carolina. During his high school football career, he had 6,242 rushing yards, 7,299 total yards, and 126 touchdowns while playing for the Trojans. He scored seven touchdowns in a single game twice, which is among his 15 school records. He committed to North Carolina State University to play college football.

== College career ==
Miller-Hines played at NC State from 2015 to 2017 under head coach Dave Doeren. As a junior in 2017, he rushed for 1,112 yards on 197 carries with 12 touchdowns. He was the MVP of the 2017 Sun Bowl. After the season, he decided to forgo his senior year and enter the 2018 NFL draft. He finished his career with 1,400 rushing yards and 13 rushing touchdowns.

In addition, Miller-Hines was a member of NC State's track team. At the Atlantic Coast Conference (ACC) outdoor track and field championships he placed third in the 100 meters, with a personal-best time of 10.34 seconds. He also recorded a personal-best time of 21.31 seconds in 200 meters, placing him eighth. His personal-best in the 60 meters is 6.71 seconds, placing him third at the ACC indoor championships.

== Professional career ==
Hines' 4.38 second 40-yard dash was the fastest among 2018 NFL Draft Combine running backs.

Pre-draft measurables
Height	Weight	Arm length	Hand span	Wingspan	40-yard dash	10-yard split	20-yard split	20-yard shuttle	Three-cone drill	Vertical jump	Broad jump	Bench press
5 ft 8 3/8 in (1.74 m)	198 lb (90 kg)	30 3/4 in (0.78 m)	8 7/8 in (0.23 m)	6 ft 0 1/2 in (1.84 m)	4.38 s	1.56 s	2.55 s	4.27 s	6.90 s	35.5 in (0.90 m)	10 ft 1 in (3.07 m)	11 reps
All values from NFL Combine/Pro Day

=== Indianapolis Colts ===
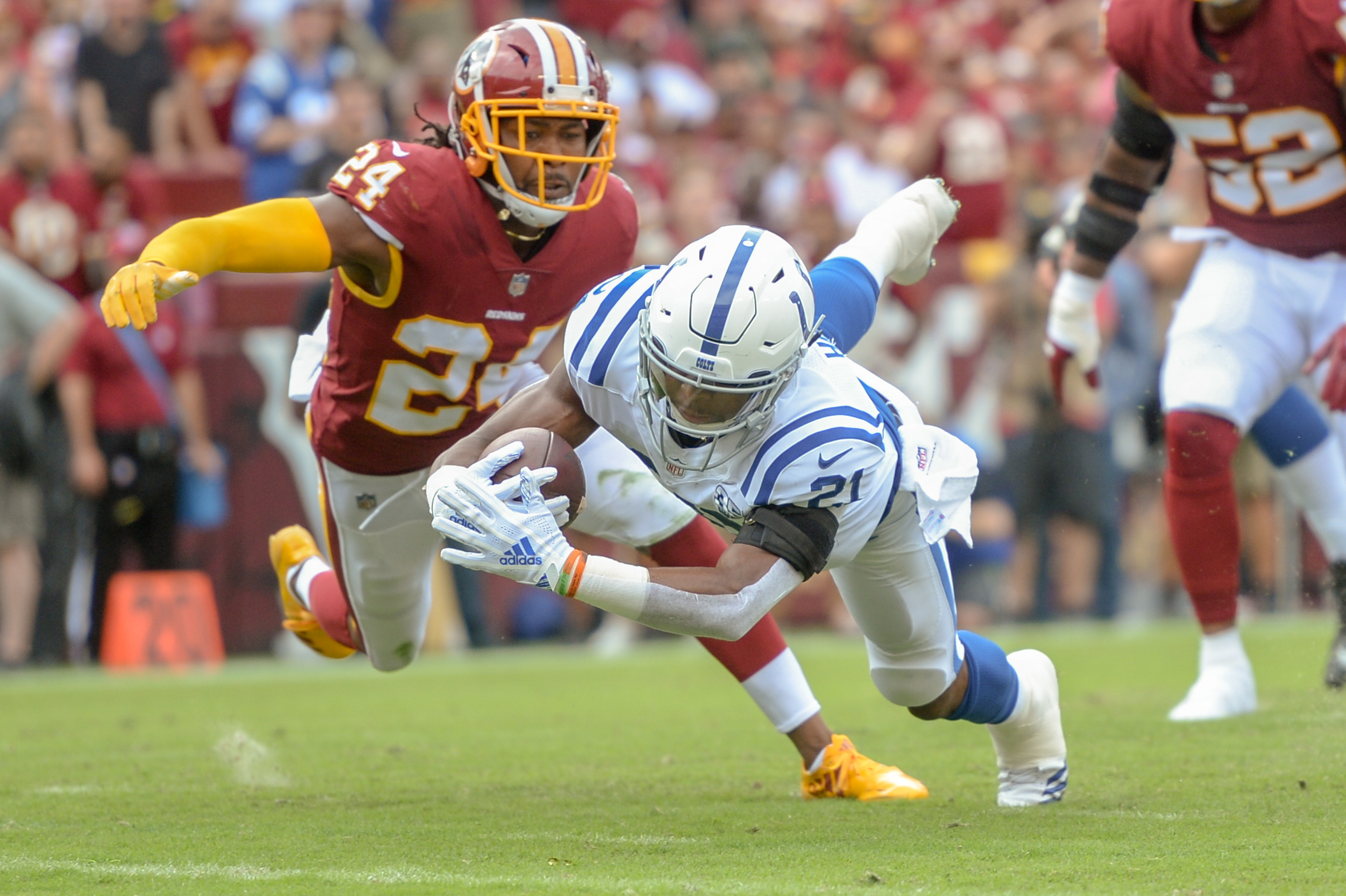
Miller-Hines playing against the Washington Redskins in 2018.

Miller-Hines was selected by the Indianapolis Colts in the fourth round, 104th overall of the 2018 NFL draft. In his NFL debut, a season-opening 34–23 loss to the Cincinnati Bengals, Miller-Hines had five carries for 19 rushing yards along with seven receptions for 33 receiving yards. In the following game, a 21–9 victory over the Washington Redskins, Miller-Hines scored his first professional touchdown, an eight-yard rush. In Week 4, against the Houston Texans, Miller-Hines had nine receptions for 63 receiving yards and two receiving touchdowns in the overtime loss. Overall, he finished his rookie season with 314 rushing yards, two rushing touchdowns, 63 receptions, 425 receiving yards, and two receiving touchdowns. In the Wild Card Round against the Texans, he played but recorded no meaningful statistics in his playoff debut, a 21–7 victory. In the Divisional Round against the Kansas City Chiefs, he had three carries for 24 rushing yards in the 31–13 loss.

In Week 16 of the 2019 season against the Carolina Panthers, Miller-Hines returned two punts for touchdowns, the first one being an 84-yard return and the second one being a 71-yard return, during the 38–6 win. He became the first player since Darius Reynaud in 2012 to have two punt returns for a touchdown in a single game. In addition, he became the first player in franchise history to accomplish the feat. He earned AFC Special Teams Player of the Week. Overall, Miller-Hines finished the 2019 season with 52 carries for 199 rushing yards and two rushing touchdowns to go along with 44 receptions for 320 receiving yards.

In the Colts' 2020 season opener against the Jacksonville Jaguars, Miller-Hines rushed for 28 yards and a rushing touchdown and caught eight passes for 45 yards and a receiving touchdown in the 27–20 loss. In Week 8 against the Detroit Lions, Miller-Hines recorded 54 receiving yards and two receiving touchdowns in the 41–21 victory. In Week 10 against the Tennessee Titans on Thursday Night Football, he had 115 scrimmage yards, one rushing touchdown, and one receiving touchdown in the 34–17 victory. In the 2020 season, Miller-Hines finished with 89 carries for 380 rushing yards and three rushing touchdowns to go along with 63 receptions for 482 receiving yards and four receiving touchdowns.

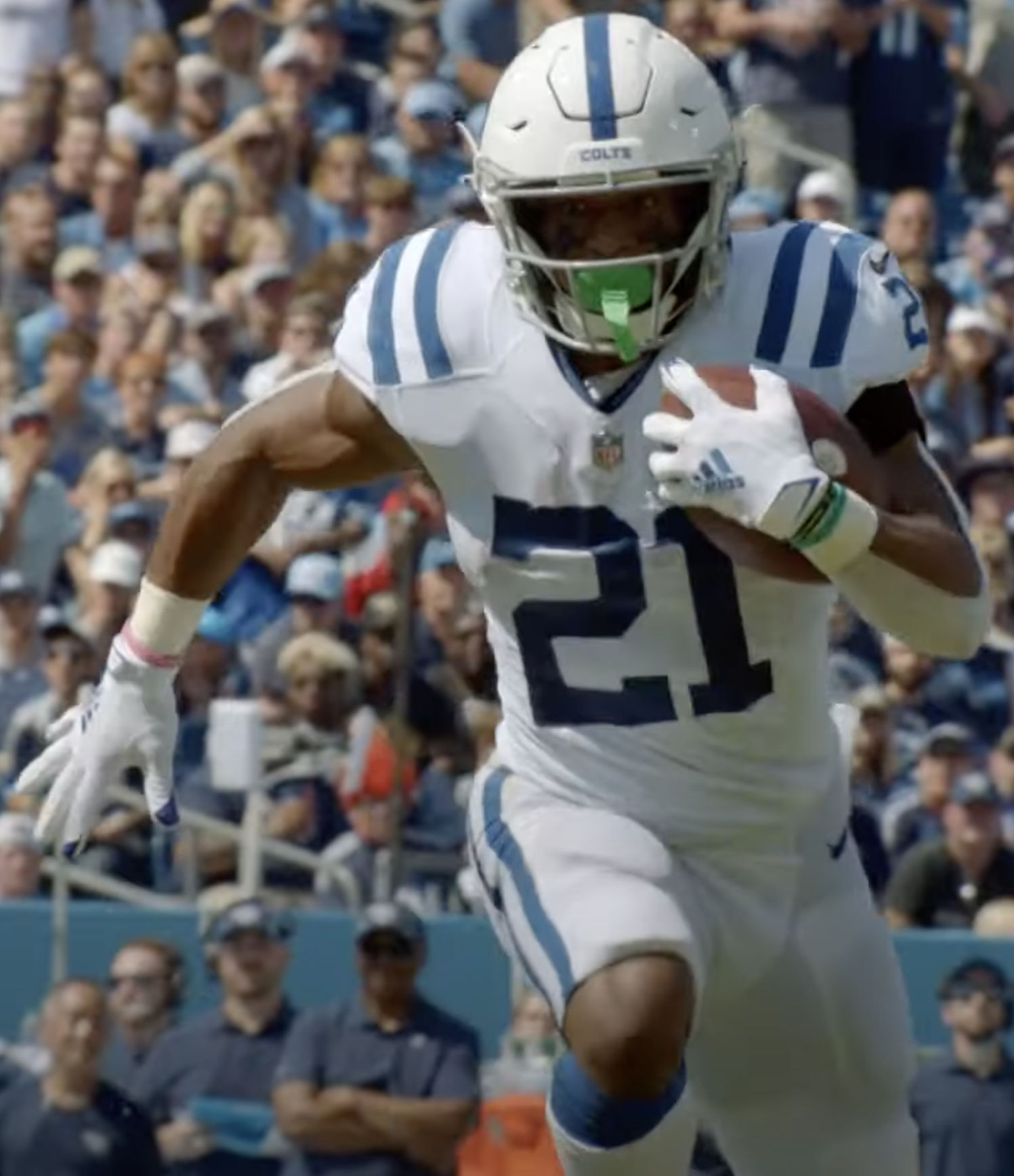
Miller-Hines playing against the Tennessee Titans in 2021.

On September 10, 2021, Miller-Hines signed a three-year, $18.6 million contract extension with the Colts. Miller-Hines finished the 2021 season with 56 carries for 276 rushing yards and two rushing touchdowns to go along with 40 receptions for 310 receiving yards and one receiving touchdown.

=== Buffalo Bills ===
On November 1, 2022, the Colts traded Miller-Hines to the Buffalo Bills in exchange for running back Zack Moss and a conditional sixth-round pick in the 2023 NFL draft. In Week 18 against the New England Patriots, Miller-Hines returned two kickoffs for touchdowns, becoming the eleventh NFL player to do so in a single game in the 35–23 win. Hines appeared in 16 games and started five in the 2022 season. He totaled 30 receptions for 241 receiving yards and a receiving touchdown while adding a rushing touchdown. He was a major part of the kickoff return game toward the end of the season.

Miller-Hines missed the entire 2023 season after sustaining a leg injury in a personal watercraft accident during the offseason, in which he and another jet ski driver collided with each other. He was placed on the reserve/non-football injury list on July 25, 2023.

On March 6, 2024, Miller-Hines was released by the Bills.

=== Cleveland Browns ===
On March 13, 2024, Miller-Hines signed with the Cleveland Browns. He was placed on the reserve/non-football injury list to start the season, and did not appear for Cleveland during the year. On February 18, 2025, Miller-Hines was released by the Browns.

=== Los Angeles Chargers ===
On July 22, 2025, Miller-Hines signed with the Los Angeles Chargers. He was released on August 26 and re-signed to the practice squad the next day. Miller-Hines was released by the Chargers on September 7. On October 7, he re-signed with Los Angeles' practice squad. Miller-Hines made three appearances for Los Angeles as a practice squad elevation, recording two negative yards on two rushes. He was released on October 28.

=== New Orleans Saints ===
On December 18, 2025, Miller-Hines was signed to the New Orleans Saints' practice squad. He played in one game for the Saints as a practice squad elevation.

== Career statistics ==
=== NFL ===
Legend
	Led the league
**Bold**	Career best

==== Regular season ====
Year	Team	Games		Rushing					Receiving					Returning					Fumbles	
Year	Team	GP	GS	Att	Yds	Y/A	Lng	TD	Rec	Yds	Y/R	Lng	TD	Ret	Yds	Y/R	Lng	TD	Fum	Lost
2018	IND	16	**4**	85	314	3.7	18	2	**63**	425	6.7	28	2	0	0	—	0	0	1	**0**
2019	IND	16	2	52	199	3.8	18	2	44	320	7.3	21	0	15	404	**26.9**	84	**2** (Note: Led the league in punts returned for touchdowns (2).)	1	1
2020	IND	16	2	**89**	**380**	4.3	31	**3**	**63**	**482**	7.7	29	**4**	33 (Note: Led the league in punts returned (30).)	370	11.2	27	0	**0**	**0**
2021	IND	**17**	4	56	276	**4.9**	**34**	2	40	310	7.8	**36**	1	27	240	8.9	20	0	3	2
2022	IND	7	4	18	36	2.0	9	1	25	188	7.5	22	0	11	111	10.1	24	0	1	**0**
2022	BUF	9	1	6	-3	-0.5	3	0	5	53	**10.6**	21	1	**35**	**707**	20.2	**101**	**2** (Note: Led the league in kickoffs returned for touchdowns (2).)	1	**0**
2025	LAC	3	0	2	-2	-1.0	1	0	0	0	0.0	0	0	7	195	27.9	40	0	0	**0**
2025	NO	1	0	0	0	0.0	0	0	0	0	0	0	0	1	11	11.0	11	0	0	**0**
Career		85	17	308	1,200	3.9	34	10	240	1,778	7.4	36	8	129	2,038	15.8	101	4	7	3

==== Postseason ====
Year	Team	Games		Rushing					Receiving					Fumbles	
Year	Team	GP	GS	Att	Yds	Y/A	Lng	TD	Rec	Yds	Y/R	Lng	TD	Fum	Lost
2018	IND	**2**	**1**	3	24	8.0	14	**0**	0	0	—	0	**0**	**0**	**0**
2020	IND	1	0	**6**	**75**	**12.5**	**33**	**0**	1	**8**	**8.0**	**8**	**0**	**0**	**0**
2022	BUF	2	0	0	0	0.0	0	0	**2**	11	5.5	7	0	0	0
Career		5	1	9	99	11.0	33	0	3	19	6.3	8	0	0	0

=== College ===
Season	Team	Conf	Class	Pos	GP	Rushing				Receiving			
Season	Team	Conf	Class	Pos	GP	Att	Yds	Avg	TD	Rec	Yds	Avg	TD
2015	NC State	ACC	FR	WR	13	48	243	5.1	1	20	256	12.8	1
2016	NC State	ACC	SO	RB	12	13	44	3.4	0	43	525	12.2	0
2017	NC State	ACC	JR	RB	13	197	1,113	5.6	12	26	152	5.8	0
Career					38	258	1,400	5.4	13	89	933	10.5	1

== Personal life ==
Miller-Hines' twin sister, Nyah, competed for the NC State track and field team. Miller-Hines has worked at Bojangles in the off-season to prepare for business after football.
