= 2020 Indianapolis Colts season =

68th season in franchise history

- Owner: Jim Irsay
- General manager: Chris Ballard
- Head coach: Frank Reich
- Offensive coordinator: Nick Sirianni
- Defensive coordinator: Matt Eberflus
- Home stadium: Lucas Oil Stadium

Results
- Record: 11–5
- Division place: 2nd AFC South
- Playoffs: Lost Wild Card Playoffs (at Bills) 24–27
- All-Pros: LG Quenton Nelson (1st team); DT DeForest Buckner (1st team); LB Shaquille Leonard (1st team); ST George Odum (1st team); C Ryan Kelly (2nd team); LS Luke Rhodes (2nd team)
- Pro Bowlers: G Quenton Nelson; C Ryan Kelly; OLB Shaquille Leonard

Uniform
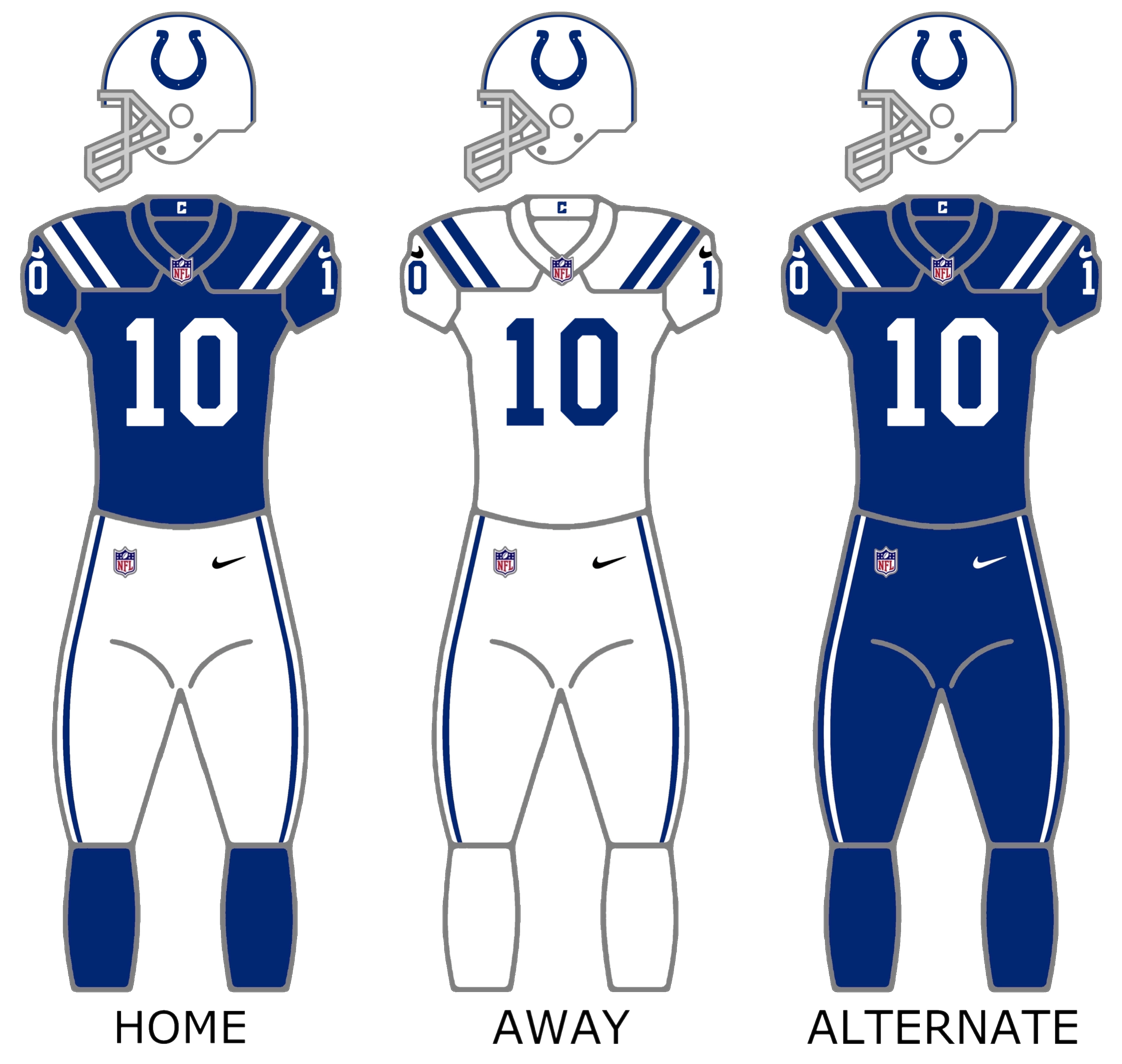

The 2020 season was the Indianapolis Colts' 68th in the National Football League (NFL), their 37th in Indianapolis, and their 13th playing their home games at Lucas Oil Stadium. It was also their third season under head coach Frank Reich and fourth under the leadership of general manager Chris Ballard. Long-time San Diego/Los Angeles Chargers quarterback Philip Rivers signed a one-year contract worth $25 million on March 17, 2020, to take over as the team's starting quarterback, reuniting him with Frank Reich, who served as quarterbacks coach for the Chargers during the 2013 season.

Despite giving the Jacksonville Jaguars their only win of the season in their season opener, the Colts improved upon their 7–9 season from the previous year with a Week 13 win over the Houston Texans and returned to the playoffs as a Wild Card as the 7th seed. The Colts finished tied with the Tennessee Titans for the AFC South division title, with an 11–5 record, but lost the tiebreaker based on record vs. division opponents (5–1 to 4–2). Before the season, the NFL decided to add a 7th team from each conference in the postseason. This proved to be a crucial decision, because had the NFL stuck with 6 teams per conference in the playoffs, the Colts would've joined the 1985 Broncos and 2008 Patriots as the only teams in NFL history to go 11-5 but fail to qualify for the playoffs. In the Wild Card, the Colts were defeated by the Buffalo Bills 27–24, marking the only time in his career Rivers lost in the Wild Card Round.

Following the season, Rivers announced his retirement on January 20, 2021, after 17 years in the league. After starting a total of 252 straight games and never missing a single start in his career, Rivers also retired as 2nd in the all-time consecutive starts list, only behind former long-time Packers quarterback Brett Favre. Rivers' retirement left Russell Wilson of the Seattle Seahawks as the new longest active leader for consecutive starts by a quarterback. However, his retirement would not last long, and the Colts resigned him five seasons later.

As of 2025, this is the most recent playoff appearance for the Colts. This was the Colts' only playoff appearance from 2019 to 2025.

== Draft ==
2020 Indianapolis Colts Draft
Round	Selection	Player	Position	College	Notes
2	34	Michael Pittman Jr.	WR	USC	from Washington Redskins
2	41	Jonathan Taylor	RB	Wisconsin	from Cleveland Browns
3	85	Julian Blackmon	S	Utah	from Philadelphia Eagles via Detroit Lions
4	122	Jacob Eason	QB	Washington	
5	149	Danny Pinter	G	Ball State	from Detroit Lions
6	193	Robert Windsor	DT	Penn State	
6	211	Isaiah Rodgers	CB	UMass	from New York Jets via Kansas City Chiefs
6	212	Dezmon Patmon	WR	Washington State	from New England Patriots
6	213	Jordan Glasgow	LB	Michigan	from New England Patriots

2020 Indianapolis Colts undrafted free agents
Name	Position	College	Ref.
Rodrigo Blankenship	K	Georgia	
Kameron Cline	DT	South Dakota	
Kendall Coleman	DE	Syracuse	
Farrod Green	TE	Mississippi State	
DeMichael Harris	WR	Southern Miss	
Carter O'Donnell	T	Alberta	
Travis Reed	CB	South Alabama	
Donald Rutledge	S	Georgia Southern	
Brandon Wellington	LB	Washington	
Chris Williams	DT	Wagner	

== Staff ==
2020 Indianapolis Colts staff
Front office: Owner – Jim Irsay; General manager – Chris Ballard; Assistant general manager – Ed Dodds; Vice president of player personnel – Vacant; Director of football administration – Mike Bluem; Director of pro personnel – Kevin Rogers Jr.; Director of college scouting – Morocco Brown; Assistant director of pro scouting – Jon Shaw; Assistant director of college scouting – Matt Tarpening; Senior player personnel scout – Todd Vasvari; Director of player development – Brian Decker; Head coaches: Head coach – Frank Reich; Assistant to the Head coach – Tyler Boyles; Offensive coaches: Offensive coordinator – Nick Sirianni; Quarterbacks – Marcus Brady; Running backs – Tom Rathman; Wide receivers – Mike Groh; Tight ends – Jason Michael; Offensive line – Chris Strausser; Assistant offensive line – Klayton Adams; Pass game specialist – Kevin Patullo; Offensive quality control – Parks Frazier; Offensive quality control – Jerrod Johnson	Defensive coaches: Defensive coordinator – Matt Eberflus; Defensive line – Brian Baker; Special defensive assistant/asst. defensive line – Matt Raich; Linebackers – Dave Borgonzi; Defensive backs/cornerbacks – Jonathan Gannon; Defensive backs/safeties – Alan Williams; Defensive quality control – David Overstreet II; Special teams coaches: Special teams coordinator – Raymond Ventrone; Assistant special teams – Franky Ross; Strength and conditioning: Director of sports performance – Rusty Jones; Sports science/conditioning – Ryan Podell; Head strength and conditioning – Richard Howell; Assistant strength and conditioning – Doug McKenney; Assistant strength and conditioning – Zane Fakes

== Final roster ==
2020 Indianapolis Colts roster
Quarterbacks (QB): 7 Jacoby Brissett; 9 Jacob Eason; 17 Philip Rivers; Running backs (RB): 21 Nyheim Hines; 28 Jonathan Taylor; Wide receivers (WR): 16 Ashton Dulin; 12 DeMichael Harris; 13 T. Y. Hilton; 14 Zach Pascal; 85 Dezmon Patmon; 11 Michael Pittman Jr.; Tight ends (TE): 81 Mo Alie-Cox; 80 Trey Burton; 84 Jack Doyle; 86 Noah Togiai	Offensive linemen (OL): 64 Mark Glowinski G; 75 Chaz Green T; 69 Will Holden T; 68 Joey Hunt C; 78 Ryan Kelly C; 56 Quenton Nelson G; 63 Danny Pinter C/G; 72 Braden Smith T; 65 Jared Veldheer T; Defensive linemen (DL): 96 Denico Autry DE; 52 Ben Banogu DE; 99 DeForest Buckner DT; 50 Justin Houston DE; 94 Tyquan Lewis DE/DT; 97 Al-Quadin Muhammad DE; 76 Taylor Stallworth DT; 90 Grover Stewart DT; 57 Kemoko Turay DE	Linebackers (LB): 49 Matthew Adams OLB; 44 Zaire Franklin OLB/MLB; 59 Jordan Glasgow OLB; 53 Shaquille Leonard OLB; 58 Bobby Okereke OLB; 45 E. J. Speed OLB; 54 Anthony Walker MLB; Defensive backs (DB): 32 Julian Blackmon FS; 38 T. J. Carrie CB; 23 Kenny Moore CB; 30 George Odum FS; 27 Xavier Rhodes CB; 34 Isaiah Rodgers CB; 35 Tremon Smith CB; 37 Khari Willis SS; 31 Tavon Wilson SS; 26 Rock Ya-Sin CB; Special teams (ST): 3 Rodrigo Blankenship K; 46 Luke Rhodes LS; 8 Rigoberto Sanchez P	Practice squad: 40 Darius Anderson RB; 33 Ibraheim Campbell SS; 36 Andre Chachere SS; 92 Kameron Cline DT; 60 Jake Eldrenkamp G; 10 Daurice Fountain WR; 41 Farrod Green TE; 67 Sam Jones C/G; 61 Carter O'Donnell T; 39 Paul Perkins RB; 5 Austin Rehkow P; 42 Will Sunderland CB; 73 J'Marcus Webb T; 66 Chris Williams DT; 93 Robert Windsor DT; Reserve: 15 Parris Campbell WR (IR); 74 Anthony Castonzo T (IR); 62 Le'Raven Clark T (IR); 29 Malik Hooker FS (IR); 25 Marlon Mack RB (IR); 42 Rolan Milligan FS (Opt-out); 55 Skai Moore MLB (Opt-out); 39 Marvell Tell CB (Opt-out); 20 Jordan Wilkins RB (COVID-19); Rookies in italics 53 active, 9 reserve, 15 practice squad

== Preseason ==
The Colts' preseason schedule was announced on May 7, but was later cancelled due to the COVID-19 pandemic.

Week	Date	Opponent	Venue	Result
1	August 13	Philadelphia Eagles	Lucas Oil Stadium	Cancelled due to the COVID-19 pandemic
2	August 24	Washington Football Team	Lucas Oil Stadium	Cancelled due to the COVID-19 pandemic
3	August 29	at Buffalo Bills	New Era Field	Cancelled due to the COVID-19 pandemic
4	September 3	at Cincinnati Bengals	Paul Brown Stadium	Cancelled due to the COVID-19 pandemic

== Regular season ==
=== Schedule ===
The Colts' 2020 schedule was announced on May 7.

Week	Date	Opponent	Result	Record	Venue	Recap
1	September 13	at **Jacksonville Jaguars**	**L** 20–27	0–1	TIAA Bank Field	Recap
2	September 20	Minnesota Vikings	**W** 28–11	1–1	Lucas Oil Stadium	Recap
3	September 27	New York Jets	**W** 36–7	2–1	Lucas Oil Stadium	Recap
4	October 4	at Chicago Bears	**W** 19–11	3–1	Soldier Field	Recap
5	October 11	at Cleveland Browns	**L** 23–32	3–2	FirstEnergy Stadium	Recap
6	October 18	Cincinnati Bengals	**W** 31–27	4–2	Lucas Oil Stadium	Recap
7	Bye					
8	November 1	at Detroit Lions	**W** 41–21	5–2	Ford Field	Recap
9	November 8	Baltimore Ravens	**L** 10–24	5–3	Lucas Oil Stadium	Recap
10	November 12	at **Tennessee Titans**	**W** 34–17	6–3	Nissan Stadium	Recap
11	November 22	Green Bay Packers	**W** 34–31 (OT)	7–3	Lucas Oil Stadium	Recap
12	November 29	**Tennessee Titans**	**L** 26–45	7–4	Lucas Oil Stadium	Recap
13	December 6	at **Houston Texans**	**W** 26–20	8–4	NRG Stadium	Recap
14	December 13	at Las Vegas Raiders	**W** 44–27	9–4	Allegiant Stadium	Recap
15	December 20	**Houston Texans**	**W** 27–20	10–4	Lucas Oil Stadium	Recap
16	December 27	at Pittsburgh Steelers	**L** 24–28	10–5	Heinz Field	Recap
17	January 3	**Jacksonville Jaguars**	**W** 28–14	11–5	Lucas Oil Stadium	Recap

Note: Intra-division opponents are in bold text.

=== Game summaries ===
==== Week 1: at Jacksonville Jaguars ====
Week 1: Indianapolis Colts at Jacksonville Jaguars – Game summary

Quarter	1	2	3	4	Total
Colts	7	10	0	3	**20**
**Jaguars**	0	14	3	10	**27**

at TIAA Bank Field, Jacksonville, Florida

- Date: September 13
- Game time: 1:00 p.m. EDT
- Game weather: Partly cloudy, 80 °F (27 °C)
- Game attendance: 14,100
- Referee: John Hussey
- TV announcers (CBS): Spero Dedes and Adam Archuleta
- Recap, Game Book

Game information

**First quarter**

- IND – Nyheim Hines 12-yard run (Rodrigo Blankenship kick), 11:42. Colts 7–0. **Drive: 7 plays, 63 yards, 3:18.**

**Second quarter**

- JAX – D. J. Chark 6-yard pass from Gardner Minshew (Josh Lambo kick), 10:42. Tied 7–7. **Drive: 4 plays, 27 yards, 2:08.**
- IND - Nyheim Hines 8-yard pass from Philip Rivers (Rodrigo Blankenship kick), 4:45. Colts 14–7. **Drive: 11 plays, 75 yards, 5:57.**
- JAX – Laviska Shenault 15-yard pass from Gardner Minshew (Josh Lambo kick), 1:38. Tied 14–14. **Drive: 9 plays, 75 yards, 3:07.**
- IND - Rodrigo Blankenship 38-yard field goal, 0:05. Colts 17–14. **Drive: 7 plays, 47 yards, 1:33.**

**Third quarter**

- JAX – Josh Lambo 50-yard field goal, 3:30. Tied 17–17. **Drive: 7 plays, 18 yards, 4:12.**

**Fourth quarter**

- IND - Rodrigo Blankenship 25-yard field goal, 9:39. Colts 20–17. **Drive: 14 plays, 71 yards, 8:51.**
- JAX – Keelan Cole 22-yard pass from Gardner Minshew (Josh Lambo kick), 5:56. Jaguars 24–20. **Drive: 6 plays, 60 yards, 3:43.**
- JAX – Josh Lambo 46-yard field goal, 2:50. Jaguars 27–20. **Drive: 4 plays, 3 yards, 1:34.**

**Top passers**

- IND – Philip Rivers – 36/46, 363 yards, TD, 2 INT
- JAX – Gardner Minshew – 19/20, 173 yards, 3 TD

**Top rushers**

- IND – Nyheim Hines – 7 rushes, 28 yards, TD
- JAX – James Robinson – 16 rushes, 62 yards

**Top receivers**

- IND – Parris Campbell – 6 receptions, 71 yards
- JAX – Keelan Cole – 5 receptions, 47 yards, TD

The Colts failed to win in Week 1 for the seventh consecutive season, dating back to 2014. In addition, they also suffered their sixth consecutive road loss to the Jaguars. This was the Jaguars only win of the season.

==== Week 2: vs. Minnesota Vikings ====
Week 2: Minnesota Vikings at Indianapolis Colts – Game summary

Quarter	1	2	3	4	Total
Vikings	3	0	0	8	**11**
**Colts**	0	15	3	10	**28**

at Lucas Oil Stadium, Indianapolis, Indiana

- Date: September 20
- Game time: 1:00 p.m. EDT
- Game weather: Sunny, 65 °F (18 °C) (retractable roof open)
- Game attendance: 2,500
- Referee: Alex Kemp
- TV announcers (Fox): Tim Brando, Robert Smith and Sarah Kustok
- Preview, Game Book

Game information

**First quarter**

- MIN – Dan Bailey 21-yard field goal, 9:01. Vikings 3–0. **Drive: 13 plays, 75 yards, 5:59.**

**Second quarter**

- IND – Jonathan Taylor 5-yard run (Rodrigo Blankenship kick), 11:45. Colts 7–3. **Drive: 4 plays, 35 yards, 1:29.**
- IND – Kirk Cousins sacked in endzone by DeForest Buckner for a safety, 4:54. Colts 9–3.
- IND – Rodrigo Blankenship 28-yard field goal, 1:10. Colts 12–3. **Drive: 8 plays, 58 yards, 3:44.**
- IND – Rodrigo Blankenship 38-yard field goal, 0:24. Colts 15–3. **Drive: 4 plays, 9 yards, 0:21.**

**Third quarter**

- IND – Rodrigo Blankenship 38-yard field goal, 9:27. Colts 18–3. **Drive: 4 plays, 2 yards, 1:26.**

**Fourth quarter**

- IND – Zach Pascal 2-yard pass from Philip Rivers (Rodrigo Blankenship kick), 14:00. Colts 25–3. **Drive: 10 plays, 65 yards, 6:25.**
- IND – Rodrigo Blankenship 44-yard field goal, 8:47. Colts 28–3. **Drive: 6 plays, 36 yards, 3:43.**
- MIN – Dalvin Cook 3-yard run (Dalvin Cook run), 5:20. Colts 28–11. **Drive: 8 plays, 75 yards, 3:27.**

**Top passers**

- MIN – Kirk Cousins – 11/26, 113 yards, 3 INT
- IND – Philip Rivers – 19/25, 214 yards, TD, INT

**Top rushers**

- MIN – Dalvin Cook – 14 rushes, 63 yards, TD
- IND – Jonathan Taylor – 26 rushes, 101 yards, TD

**Top receivers**

- MIN – Justin Jefferson – 3 receptions, 44 yards
- IND – Mo Alie-Cox – 5 receptions, 111 yards, TD, INT

This game marked the team's 300th home win in franchise history. Vikings QB Kirk Cousins struggled immensely, throwing 3 interceptions, just 113 yards and 11 completions on 26 attempts, and a passer rating of 15.9

==== Week 3: vs. New York Jets ====
Week 3: New York Jets at Indianapolis Colts – Game summary

Quarter	1	2	3	4	Total
Jets	7	0	0	0	**7**
**Colts**	7	10	14	5	**36**

at Lucas Oil Stadium, Indianapolis, Indiana

- Date: September 27
- Game time: 4:05 p.m. EDT
- Game weather: Sunny, 79 °F (26 °C) (retractable roof open)
- Game attendance: 7,480
- Referee: Craig Wrolstad
- TV announcers (CBS): Kevin Harlan, Trent Green and Melanie Collins
- Recap, Game Book

Game information

**First quarter**

- IND – Xavier Rhodes 44-yard interception return (Rodrigo Blankenship kick), 12:25. Colts 7–0.
- NYJ – Braxton Berrios 16-yard pass from Sam Darnold (Sam Ficken kick), 5:12. Tied 7–7. **Drive: 14 plays, 88 yards, 7:13.**

**Second quarter**

- IND – Mo Alie-Cox 1-yard pass from Philip Rivers (Rodrigo Blankenship kick), 14:13. Colts 14–7. **Drive: 11 plays, 75 yards, 5:59.**
- IND – Rodrigo Blankenship 42-yard field goal, 8:38. Colts 17–7. **Drive: 6 plays, 53 yards, 2:51.**

**Third quarter**

- IND – Jonathan Taylor 1-yard run (Rodrigo Blankenship kick), 5:21. Colts 24–7. **Drive: 10 plays, 55 yards, 5:07.**
- IND – T. J. Carrie 44-yard interception return (Rodrigo Blankenship kick), 0:00. Colts 31–7.

**Fourth quarter**

- IND – Sam Darnold sacked in end zone by Justin Houston for a safety, 4:50. Colts 33–7.
- IND – Rodrigo Blankenship 41-yard field goal, 2:04. Colts 36–7. **Drive: 5 plays, 33 yards, 2:46.**

**Top passers**

- NYJ – Sam Darnold – 17/29, 168 yards, TD, 3 INT
- IND – Philip Rivers – 17/21, 217 yards, TD

**Top rushers**

- NYJ – Frank Gore – 15 rushes, 57 yards
- IND – Jonathan Taylor – 13 rushes, 59 yards, TD

**Top passers**

- NYJ – Braxton Berrios – 4 receptions, 64 yards, TD
- IND – T. Y. Hilton – 3 receptions, 52 yards

Philip Rivers reached 400 touchdowns and 60,000 passing yards for his career. Sam Darnold threw three interceptions, two of which were returned for touchdowns by Colts defensive backs, and was sacked in the end zone for a safety.

==== Week 4: at Chicago Bears ====
Week 4: Indianapolis Colts at Chicago Bears – Game summary

Quarter	1	2	3	4	Total
**Colts**	7	6	3	3	**19**
Bears	0	3	0	8	**11**

at Soldier Field, Chicago, Illinois

- Date: October 4
- Game time: 4:25 p.m. EDT/3:25 p.m. CDT
- Game weather: Partly cloudy, 52 °F (11 °C)
- Game attendance: 0
- Referee: Craig Wrolstad
- TV announcers (CBS): Greg Gumbel, Rich Gannon and Amanda Balionis
- Recap, Game Book

Game information

**First quarter**

- IND – Mo Alie-Cox 13-yard pass from Philip Rivers (Rodrigo Blankenship kick), 8:08. Colts 7–0. **Drive: 6 plays, 53 yards, 3:35.**

**Second quarter**

- CHI – Cairo Santos 27-yard field goal, 9:24. Colts 7–3. **Drive: 9 plays, 84 yards, 4:55.**
- IND – Rodrigo Blankenship 21-yard field goal, 3:47. Colts 10–3. **Drive: 14 plays, 67 yards, 5:37.**
- IND – Rodrigo Blankenship 30-yard field goal, 0:06. Colts 13–3. **Drive: 8 plays, 43 yards, 1:59.**

**Third quarter**

- IND – Rodrigo Blankenship 44-yard field goal, 0:55. Colts 16–3. **Drive: 10 plays, 54 yards, 5:11.**

**Fourth quarter**

- IND – Rodrigo Blankenship 30-yard field goal, 3:47. Colts 19–3. **Drive: 13 plays, 66 yards, 7:12.**
- CHI – Allen Robinson 16-yard pass from Nick Foles (David Montgomery run), 1:35. Colts 19–11. **Drive: 8 plays, 90 yards, 2:12.**

**Top passers**

- IND – Philip Rivers – 16/29, 190 yards, TD
- CHI – Nick Foles – 26/42, 249 yards, TD, INT

**Top passers**

- IND – Jonathan Taylor – 17 rushes, 68 yards
- CHI – David Montgomery – 10 rushes, 27 yards

**Top passers**

- IND – Zach Pascal – 3 receptions, 58 yards
- CHI – Allen Robinson – 7 receptions, 101 yards, TD

==== Week 5: at Cleveland Browns ====
Week 5: Indianapolis Colts at Cleveland Browns – Game summary

Quarter	1	2	3	4	Total
Colts	7	3	10	3	**23**
**Browns**	3	17	7	5	**32**

at FirstEnergy Stadium, Cleveland, Ohio

- Date: October 11
- Game time: 4:25 p.m. EDT
- Game weather: Sunny, 64 °F (18 °C)
- Game attendance: 11,759
- Referee: Scott Novak
- TV announcers (CBS): Spero Dedes and Adam Archuleta
- Recap, Game Book

Game information

**First quarter**

- CLE – Cody Parkey 24-yard field goal, 10:24. Browns 3–0. **Drive: 10 plays, 69 yards, 4:36.**
- IND – Jonathan Taylor 4-yard run (Rodrigo Blankenship kick), 6:00. Colts 7–3. **Drive: 9 plays, 72 yards, 4:24.**

**Second quarter**

- CLE – Kareem Hunt 2-yard pass from Baker Mayfield (Cody Parkey kick), 14:06. Browns 10–7. **Drive: 14 plays, 81 yards, 6:54.**
- IND – Rodrigo Blankenship 32-yard field goal, 10:15. Tied 10–10. **Drive: 7 plays, 61 yards, 3:51.**
- CLE – Rashard Higgins 15-yard pass from Baker Mayfield (Cody Parkey kick), 5:58. Browns 17–10. **Drive: 9 plays, 75 yards, 4:17.**
- CLE – Cody Parkey 36-yard field goal, 0:13. Browns 20–10. **Drive: 12 plays, 64 yards, 4:00.**

**Third quarter**

- CLE – Ronnie Harrison 47-yard interception return (Cody Parkey kick), 12:15. Browns 27–10.
- IND – Isaiah Rodgers 101-yard kickoff return (Rodrigo Blankenship kick), 12:00. Browns 27–17.
- IND – Rodrigo Blankenship 37-yard field goal, 3:58. Browns 27–20. **Drive: 10 plays, 29 yards, 5:15.**

**Fourth quarter**

- CLE – Penalty on Philip Rivers enforced in end zone for a Safety, 14:39. Browns 29–20.
- IND – Rodrigo Blankenship 25-yard field goal, 2:50. Browns 29–23. **Drive: 12 plays, 63 yards, 4:15.**
- CLE – Cody Parkey 46-yard field goal, 0:21. Browns 32–23. **Drive: 8 plays, 40 yards, 2:29.**

**Top passers**

- IND – Philip Rivers – 21/33, 243 yards, 2 INT
- CLE – Baker Mayfield – 21/37, 247 yards, 2 TD, 2 INT

**Top rushers**

- IND – Jonathan Taylor – 12 rushes, 57 yards, TD
- CLE – Kareem Hunt – 20 rushes, 72 yards

**Top receivers**

- IND – T. Y. Hilton – 6 receptions, 69 yards
- CLE – Jarvis Landry – 4 receptions, 88 yards

==== Week 6: vs. Cincinnati Bengals ====
Week 6: Cincinnati Bengals at Indianapolis Colts – Game summary

Quarter	1	2	3	4	Total
Bengals	14	10	3	0	**27**
**Colts**	0	21	0	10	**31**

at Lucas Oil Stadium, Indianapolis, Indiana

- Date: October 18
- Game time: 1:00 p.m. EDT
- Game weather: Cloudy, 57 °F (14 °C) (retractable roof open)
- Game attendance: 12,453
- Referee: Land Clark
- TV announcers (Fox): Kevin Kugler, Chris Spielman and Laura Okmin
- Recap, Game Book

Game information

**First quarter**

- CIN – Giovani Bernard 2-yard run (Randy Bullock kick), 11:17. Bengals 7–0. **Drive: 7 plays, 43 yards, 2:48.**
- CIN – Joe Burrow 2-yard run (Randy Bullock kick), 3:18. Bengals 14–0. **Drive: 12 plays, 78 yards, 5:59.**

**Second quarter**

- CIN – Joe Mixon 7-yard run (Randy Bullock kick), 14:56. Bengals 21–0. **Drive: 4 plays, 70 yards, 1:49.**
- IND – Trey Burton 1-yard run (Rodrigo Blankenship kick), 12:18. Bengals 21–7. **Drive: 7 plays, 87 yards, 2:38.**
- CIN – Randy Bullock 47-yard field goal, 8:04. Bengals 24–7. **Drive: 9 plays, 46 yards, 4:14.**
- IND – Trey Burton 10-yard pass from Philip Rivers (Rodrigo Blankenship kick), 4:38. Bengals 24–14. **Drive: 9 plays, 75 yards, 3:26.**
- IND – Zach Pascal 17-yard pass from Philip Rivers (Rodrigo Blankenship kick), 0:15. Bengals 24–21. **Drive: 9 plays, 72 yards, 2:43.**

**Third quarter**

- CIN – Randy Bullock 55-yard field goal, 3:32. Bengals 27–21. **Drive: 13 plays, 62 yards, 6:03.**

**Fourth quarter**

- IND – Jack Doyle 14-yard pass from Philip Rivers (Rodrigo Blankenship kick), 14:55. Colts 28–27. **Drive: 7 plays, 75 yards, 3:37.**
- IND – Rodrigo Blankenship 40-yard field goal, 4:03. Colts 31–27. **Drive: 10 plays, 40 yards, 3:59.**

**Top passers**

- CIN – Joe Burrow – 25/39, 313 yards, INT
- IND – Philip Rivers – 29/44, 371 yards, 3 TD, INT

**Top rushers**

- CIN – Joe Mixon – 18 rushes, 54 yards, TD
- IND – Jonathan Taylor – 12 rushes, 60 yards

**Top receivers**

- CIN – Tee Higgins – 6 receptions, 125 yards
- IND – Marcus Johnson – 5 receptions, 108 yards

After trailing 0–21 in the second quarter, the Colts outscored the Bengals 31–6 to improve to 4–2 entering their bye week. The 21-point deficit is the largest comeback in a home regular season game in franchise history. It was also Philip Rivers' largest comeback win since 2006, coincidentally also against the Bengals, also Rivers' first year as a starting quarterback.

==== Week 8: at Detroit Lions ====
Week 8: Indianapolis Colts at Detroit Lions – Game summary

Quarter	1	2	3	4	Total
**Colts**	0	20	0	21	**41**
Lions	7	0	7	7	**21**

at Ford Field, Detroit, Michigan

- Date: November 1
- Game time: 1:00 p.m. EST
- Game weather: None (indoor stadium)
- Game attendance: 500
- Referee: Clay Martin
- TV announcers (CBS): Andrew Catalon, James Lofton and Michael Grady
- Recap, Game Book

Game information

**First quarter**

- DET – Marvin Jones 25-yard pass from Matthew Stafford (Matt Prater kick), 5:42. Lions 7–0. **Drive: 2 plays, 32 yards, 0:37.**

**Second quarter**

- IND – Nyheim Hines 22-yard pass from Philip Rivers (Rodrigo Blankenship kick), 11:10. Tied 7–7. **Drive: 4 plays, 61 yards, 2:13.**
- IND – Jack Doyle 7-yard pass from Philip Rivers (Rodrigo Blankenship kick), 5:32. Colts 14–7. **Drive: 10 plays, 73 yards, 3:49.**
- IND – Nyheim Hines 29-yard pass from Philip Rivers (kick failed), 0:56. Colts 20–7. **Drive: 6 plays, 48 yards, 2:50.**

**Third quarter**

- DET – Kerryon Johnson 9-yard pass from Matthew Stafford (Matt Prater kick), 11:08. Colts 20–14. **Drive: 8 plays, 68 yards, 3:52.**

**Fourth quarter**

- IND – Jordan Wilkins 1-yard run (Jordan Wilkins run), 13:34. Colts 28–14. **Drive: 8 plays, 60 yards, 3:53.**
- IND – Kenny Moore II 29-yard interception return (Rodrigo Blankenship kick), 13:26. Colts 35–14.
- DET – Marvin Jones 4-yard pass from Matthew Stafford (Matt Prater kick), 12:15. Colts 35–21. **Drive: 4 plays, 75 yards, 1:11.**
- IND – Trey Burton 2-yard run (kick failed), 7:01. Colts 41–21. **Drive: 12 plays, 73 yards, 5:14.**

**Top passers**

- IND – Philip Rivers – 23/33, 262 yards, 3 TD
- DET – Matthew Stafford – 24/42, 336 yards, 3 TD, INT

**Top rushers**

- IND – Jordan Wilkins – 20 rushes, 89 yards, TD
- DET – Jamal Agnew – 1 rush, 11 yards

**Top receivers**

- IND – Nyheim Hines – 3 receptions, 54 yards, 2 TD
- DET – Marvin Hall – 4 receptions, 113 yards

==== Week 9: vs. Baltimore Ravens ====
Week 9: Baltimore Ravens at Indianapolis Colts – Game summary

Quarter	1	2	3	4	Total
**Ravens**	7	0	7	10	**24**
Colts	7	3	0	0	**10**

at Lucas Oil Stadium, Indianapolis, Indiana

- Date: November 8
- Game time: 1:00 p.m. EST
- Game weather: Sunny, 76 °F (24 °C) (retractable roof open)
- Game attendance: 12,200
- Referee: Adrian Hill
- TV announcers (CBS): Ian Eagle, Charles Davis and Evan Washburn
- Recap, Game Book

Game information

**First quarter**

- IND – Jonathan Taylor 1-yard run (Rodrigo Blankenship kick), 5:33. Colts 7–0. **Drive:8 plays, 65 yards, 4:41.**
- BAL – Chuck Clark 65-yard fumble return (Justin Tucker kick), 1:11. Tied 7–7.

**Second quarter**

- IND – Rodrigo Blankenship 43-yard field goal, 0:45. Colts 10–7. **Drive: 11 plays, 68 yards, 4:38.**

**Third quarter**

- BAL – Gus Edwards 1-yard run (Justin Tucker kick), 5:43. Ravens 14–10. **Drive:10 plays, 54 yards, 5:15.**

**Fourth quarter**

- BAL – Lamar Jackson 9-yard run (Justin Tucker kick), 11:08. Ravens 21–10. **Drive: 14 plays, 75 yards, 8:23.**
- BAL – Justin Tucker 48-yard field goal, 2:08. Ravens 24–10. **Drive: 4 plays, 6 yards, 2:12.**

**Top passers**

- BAL – Lamar Jackson – 19/23, 170 yards
- IND – Philip Rivers – 26/44, 227 yards, INT

**Top rushers**

- BAL – Lamar Jackson – 13 rushes, 58 yards, TD
- IND – Jordan Wilkins – 11 rushes, 39 yards

**Top receivers**

- BAL – Nick Boyle – 4 receptions, 46 yards
- IND – Michael Pittman Jr. – 4 receptions, 56 yards

==== Week 10: at Tennessee Titans ====
Week 10: Indianapolis Colts at Tennessee Titans – Game summary

Quarter	1	2	3	4	Total
**Colts**	3	10	14	7	**34**
Titans	7	10	0	0	**17**

at Nissan Stadium, Nashville, Tennessee

- Date: November 12
- Game time: 8:20 p.m. EST/7:20 p.m. CST
- Game weather: Clear, 56 °F (13 °C)
- Game attendance: 13,949
- Referee: Brad Allen
- TV announcers (Fox/NFLN/Amazon Prime): Joe Buck, Troy Aikman, Erin Andrews and Kristina Pink
- Recap, Game Book

Game information

**First quarter**

- TEN – D'Onta Foreman 5-yard pass from Ryan Tannehill (Stephen Gostkowski kick), 11:50. Titans 7–0. **Drive: 6 plays, 67 yards, 3:10.**
- IND – Rodrigo Blankenship 24-yard field goal, 0:36. Titans 7–3. **Drive: 11 plays, 69 yards, 4:30.**

**Second Quarter**

- TEN – Stephen Gostkowski 50-yard field goal, 11:12. Titans 10–3. **Drive: 8 plays, 43 yards, 4:24.**
- IND – Nyheim Hines 13-yard pass from Philip Rivers (Rodrigo Blankenship kick), 7:49. Tied 10–10. **Drive: 8 plays, 80 yards, 3:23.**
- TEN – Jonnu Smith 1-yard run (Stephen Gostkowski kick), 2:54. Titans 17–10. **Drive: 9 plays, 75 yards, 4:55.**
- IND – Rodrigo Blankenship 43-yard field goal, 0:00. Titans 17–13. **Drive: 13 plays, 51 yards, 2:54.**

**Third quarter**

- IND – Nyheim Hines 2-yard run (Rodrigo Blankenship kick), 2:51. Colts 20–17. **Drive: 4 plays, 27 yards, 1:18.**
- IND – T. J. Carrie 6-yard return of blocked punt (Rodrigo Blankenship kick), 1:52. Colts 27–17.

**Fourth quarter**

- IND – Jacoby Brissett 2-yard run (Rodrigo Blankenship kick), 9:21. Colts 34–17. **Drive: 4 plays, 66 yards, 2:50.**

**Top passers**

- IND – Philip Rivers – 29/39, 308 yards, TD
- TEN – Ryan Tannehill – 15/27, 158 yards, TD

**Top rushers**

- IND – Nyheim Hines – 12 rushes, 70 yards, TD
- TEN – Derrick Henry – 19 rushes, 103 yards

**Top receivers**

- IND – Michael Pittman Jr. – 7 receptions, 101 yards
- TEN – Corey Davis – 5 receptions, 67 yards

==== Week 11: vs. Green Bay Packers ====
Week 11: Green Bay Packers at Indianapolis Colts – Game summary

Quarter	1	2	3	4	OT	Total
Packers	7	21	0	3	0	**31**
**Colts**	7	7	11	6	3	**34**

at Lucas Oil Stadium, Indianapolis, Indiana

- Date: November 22
- Game time: 4:25 p.m. EST
- Game weather: None (retractable roof closed)
- Game attendance: 12,495
- Referee: Shawn Hochuli
- TV announcers (Fox): Joe Buck, Troy Aikman and Erin Andrews
- Recap, Game Book

Game information

**First quarter**

- GB – Robert Tonyan 25-yard pass from Aaron Rodgers (Mason Crosby kick), 8:21. Packers 7–0. **Drive: 7 plays, 51 yards, 4:06.**
- IND – Michael Pittman Jr. 45-yard pass from Philip Rivers (Rodrigo Blankenship kick), 5:45. Tied 7–7. **Drive: 5 plays, 75 yards, 2:36.**

**Second quarter**

- GB – Aaron Jones 2-yard run (Mason Crosby kick), 9:55. Packers 14–7. **Drive: 6 plays, 60 yards, 4:14.**
- GB – Davante Adams 5-yard pass from Aaron Rodgers (Mason Crosby kick), 7:48. Packers 21–7. **Drive: 4 plays, 29 yards, 1:53.**
- IND – Trey Burton 17-yard pass from Philip Rivers (Rodrigo Blankenship kick), 1:52. Packers 21–14. **Drive: 12 plays, 75 yards, 5:56.**
- GB – Jamaal Williams 4-yard pass from Aaron Rodgers (Mason Crosby kick), 0:16. Packers 28–14. **Drive: 6 plays, 75 yards, 1:36.**

**Third quarter**

- IND – Rodrigo Blankenship 37-yard field goal, 7:43. Packers 28–17. **Drive: 14 plays, 56 yards, 7:17.**
- IND – Jack Doyle 6-yard pass from Philip Rivers (Nyheim Hines run), 1:59. Packers 28–25. **Drive: 10 plays, 55 yards, 3:57.**

**Fourth quarter**

- IND – Rodrigo Blankenship 32-yard field goal, 11:12. Tied 28–28. **Drive: 8 plays, 50 yards, 3:56.**
- IND – Rodrigo Blankenship 43-yard field goal, 8:56. Colts 31–28. **Drive: 4 plays, 3 yards, 2:06.**
- GB – Mason Crosby 39-yard field goal, 0:00. Tied 31–31. **Drive: 10 plays, 86 yards, 1:22.**

**Overtime**

- IND – Rodrigo Blankenship 39-yard field goal, 7:10. Colts 34–31. **Drive: 4 plays, 8 yards, 2:02.**

**Top passers**

- GB – Aaron Rodgers – 27/38, 311 yards, 3 TD, INT
- IND – Philip Rivers – 24/36, 288 yards, 3 TD, INT

**Top rushers**

- GB – Aaron Jones – 10 rushes, 41 yards, TD
- IND – Jonathan Taylor – 22 rushes, 90 yards

**Top receivers**

- GB – Davante Adams – 7 receptions, 106 yards, TD
- IND – Michael Pittman Jr. – 3 receptions, 66 yards, TD

==== Week 12: vs. Tennessee Titans ====
Week 12: Tennessee Titans at Indianapolis Colts – Game summary

Quarter	1	2	3	4	Total
**Titans**	14	21	3	7	**45**
Colts	7	7	0	12	**26**

at Lucas Oil Stadium, Indianapolis, Indiana

- Date: November 29
- Game time: 1:00 p.m. EST
- Game weather: None (retractable roof closed)
- Game attendance: 12,464
- Referee: John Hussey
- TV announcers (CBS): Ian Eagle, Charles Davis, and Evan Washburn
- Recap, Game Book

Game information

**First quarter**

- TEN – Derrick Henry 12-yard run (Stephen Gostkowski kick), 9:12. Titans 7–0. **Drive: 10 plays, 75 yards, 5:48.**
- IND – Trey Burton 11-yard pass from Philip Rivers (Rodrigo Blankenship kick), 2:34. Tied 7–7. **Drive: 12 plays, 75 yards, 6:38.**
- TEN – A. J. Brown 69-yard pass from Ryan Tannehill (Stephen Gostkowski kick), 0:09. Titans 14–7. **Drive: 4 plays, 75 yards, 2:25.**

**Second quarter**

- IND – Jacoby Brissett 1-yard run (Rodrigo Blankenship kick), 12:51. Tied 14–14. **Drive: 6 plays, 75 yards, 2:18.**
- TEN – Derrick Henry 1-yard run (Stephen Gostkowski kick), 6:15. Titans 21–14. **Drive: 8 plays, 65 yards, 3:29.**
- TEN – Derrick Henry 11-yard run (Stephen Gostkowski kick), 1:41. Titans 28–14. **Drive: 9 plays, 86 yards, 2:44.**
- TEN – Ryan Tannehill 1-yard run (Stephen Gostkowski kick), 0:20. Titans 35–14. **Drive: 5 plays, 44 yards, 0:53.**

**Third quarter**

- TEN – Stephen Gostkowski 49-yard field goal, 0:44. Titans 38–14. **Drive: 8 plays, 32 yards, 4:54.**

**Fourth quarter**

- IND – Jacoby Brissett 1-yard run (run failed), 13:23. Titans 38–20. **Drive: 9 plays, 75 yards, 2:21.**
- IND – T. Y. Hilton 5-yard pass from Philip Rivers (pass failed), 2:34. Titans 38–26. **Drive: 11 plays, 94 yards, 3:21.**
- TEN – A. J. Brown 42-yard kickoff return (Stephen Gostkowski kick), 2:29. Titans 45–26.

**Top passers**

- TEN – Ryan Tannehill – 13/22, 221 yards, TD
- IND – Philip Rivers – 24/42, 295 yards, 2 TD, INT

**Top rushers**

- TEN – Derrick Henry – 27 rushes, 178 yards, 3 TD
- IND – Nyheim Hines – 10 rushes, 29 yards

**Top receivers**

- TEN – A. J. Brown – 4 receptions, 98 yards, TD
- IND – T. Y. Hilton – 4 receptions, 81 yards, TD

==== Week 13: at Houston Texans ====
Week 13: Indianapolis Colts at Houston Texans – Game summary

Quarter	1	2	3	4	Total
**Colts**	14	10	0	2	**26**
Texans	10	10	0	0	**20**

at NRG Stadium, Houston, Texas

- Date: December 6
- Game time: 1:00 p.m. EST/12:00 p.m. CST
- Game weather: Sunny, 57 °F (14 °C) (retractable roof open)
- Game attendance: 12,316
- Referee: Scott Novak
- TV announcers (CBS): Greg Gumbel, Rich Gannon and Sherree Burruss
- Recap, Game Book

Game information

**First quarter**

- IND – T. Y. Hilton 21-yard pass from Philip Rivers (Rodrigo Blankenship kick), 9:52. Colts 7–0. **Drive: 6 plays, 67 yards, 3:28.**
- HOU – Deshaun Watson 11-yard run (Kaʻimi Fairbairn kick), 7:51. Tied 7–7. **Drive: 4 plays, 75 yards, 2:01.**
- HOU – Kaʻimi Fairbairn 52-yard field goal, 4:37. Texans 10–7. **Drive: 6 plays, 26 yards, 1:48.**
- IND – Nyheim Hines 5-yard run (Rodrigo Blankenship kick), 0:41. Colts 14–10. **Drive: 8 plays, 72 yards, 3:52.**

**Second quarter**

- IND – Jonathan Taylor 39-yard pass from Philip Rivers (Rodrigo Blankenship kick), 9:17. Colts 21–10. **Drive: 6 plays, 57 yards, 3:15.**
- HOU – David Johnson 6-yard run (Kaʻimi Fairbairn kick), 4:39. Colts 21–17. **Drive: 9 plays, 75 yards, 4:38.**
- IND – Rodrigo Blankenship 42-yard field goal, 1:15. Colts 24–17. **Drive: 10 plays, 55 yards, 3:27.**
- HOU – Kaʻimi Fairbairn 34-yard field goal, 0:08. Colts 24–20. **Drive: 8 plays, 58 yards, 1:07.**

**Third quarter**

- No scoring plays

**Fourth quarter**

- IND – Deshaun Watson sacked in end zone by Justin Houston, 6:08. Colts 26–20.

**Top passers**

- IND – Philip Rivers – 27/35, 285 yards, 2 TD
- HOU – Deshaun Watson – 26/38, 341 yards, INT

**Top rushers**

- IND – Jonathan Taylor – 13 rushes, 91 yards
- HOU – David Johnson – 10 rushes, 44 yards, TD

**Top receivers**

- IND – T. Y. Hilton – 9 receptions, 110 yards, TD
- HOU – Keke Coutee – 8 receptions, 141 yards

==== Week 14: at Las Vegas Raiders ====
Week 14: Indianapolis Colts at Las Vegas Raiders – Game summary

Quarter	1	2	3	4	Total
**Colts**	10	10	7	17	**44**
Raiders	7	7	6	7	**27**

at Allegiant Stadium, Paradise, Nevada

- Date: December 13
- Game time: 4:05 p.m. EST/1:05 p.m. PST
- Game weather: None (indoor stadium)
- Game attendance: 0
- Referee: Clete Blakeman
- TV announcers (CBS): Ian Eagle, Charles Davis and Evan Washburn
- Recap, Game Book

Game information

**First quarter**

- IND – Rodrigo Blankenship 25-yard field goal, 8:56. Colts 3–0. **Drive: 10 plays, 68 yards, 6:08.**
- IND – T. Y. Hilton 7-yard pass from Philip Rivers (Rodrigo Blankenship kick), 2:59. Colts 10–0. **Drive: 11 plays, 72 yards, 4:50.**
- LV – Foster Moreau 47-yard pass from Derek Carr (Daniel Carlson kick), 0:09. Colts 10–7. **Drive: 5 plays, 76 yards, 2:50.**

**Second quarter**

- LV – Nelson Agholor 21-yard pass from Derek Carr (Daniel Carlson kick), 10:39. Raiders 14–10. **Drive: 8 plays, 83 yards, 3:23.**
- IND – T. Y. Hilton 44-yard pass from Philip Rivers (Rodrigo Blankenship kick), 9:03. Colts 17–14. **Drive: 3 plays, 68 yards, 1:35.**
- IND – Rodrigo Blankenship 20-yard field goal, 0:00. Colts 20–14. **Drive: 13 plays, 78 yards, 3:30.**

**Third quarter**

- LV – Daniel Carlson 25-yard field goal, 9:45. Colts 20–17. **Drive: 13 plays, 68 yards, 5:19.**
- IND – Jonathan Taylor 67-yard run (Rodrigo Blankenship kick), 7:27. Colts 27–17. **Drive: 5 plays, 75 yards, 2:14.**
- LV – Daniel Carlson 23-yard field goal, 0:17. Colts 27–20. **Drive: 14 plays, 70 yards, 7:14.**

**Fourth quarter**

- IND – Jonathan Taylor 3-yard run (Rodrigo Blankenship kick), 9:40. Colts 34–20. **Drive: 19 plays, 75 yards, 5:50.**
- IND – Rodrigo Blankenship 35-yard field goal, 6:55. Colts 37–20. **Drive: 4 plays, 9 yards, 2:25.**
- IND – Khari Willis 50-yard interception return (Rodrigo Blankenship kick), 5:32. Colts 44–20.
- LV – Derek Carr 5-yard run (Daniel Carlson kick), 0:55. Colts 44–27. **Drive: 13 plays, 75 yards, 4:27.**

**Top passers**

- IND – Philip Rivers – 19/28, 244 yards, 2 TD
- LV – Derek Carr – 31/45, 316 yards, 2 TD, 2 INT

**Top rushers**

- IND – Jonathan Taylor – 20 rushes, 150 yards, 2 TD
- LV – Josh Jacobs – 13 rushes, 49 yards

**Top receivers**

- IND – T. Y. Hilton – 5 receptions, 86 yards, 2 TD
- LV – Nelson Agholor – 5 receptions, 100 yards, TD

==== Week 15: vs. Houston Texans ====
Week 15: Houston Texans at Indianapolis Colts – Game summary

Quarter	1	2	3	4	Total
Texans	0	10	3	7	**20**
**Colts**	14	0	3	10	**27**

at Lucas Oil Stadium, Indianapolis, Indiana

- Date: December 20
- Game time: 1:00 p.m. EST
- Game weather: None (retractable roof closed)
- Game attendance: 9,992
- Referee: Bill Vinovich
- TV announcers (CBS): Greg Gumbel, Rich Gannon and Jay Feely
- Recap, Game Book

Game information

**First quarter**

- IND – Jonathan Taylor 5-yard run (Rodrigo Blankenship kick), 5:49. Colts 7–0. **Drive: 10 plays, 81 yards, 5:39.**
- IND – Zach Pascal 11-yard pass from Philip Rivers (Rodrigo Blankenship kick), 0:52. Colts 14–0. **Drive: 4 plays, 42 yards, 2:22.**

**Second quarter**

- HOU – Chad Hansen 38-yard pass from Deshaun Watson (Kaʻimi Fairbairn kick), 3:46. Colts 14–7. **Drive: 7 plays, 79 yards, 4:09.**
- HOU – Kaʻimi Fairbairn 23-yard field goal, 0:00. Colts 14–10. **Drive: 12 plays, 76 yards, 1:43.**

**Third quarter**

- IND – Rodrigo Blankenship 35-yard field goal, 8:27. Colts 17–10. **Drive: 13 plays, 58 yards, 6:33.**
- HOU – Kaʻimi Fairbairn 31-yard field goal, 1:19. Colts 17–13. **Drive: 12 plays, 55 yards, 7:08.**

**Fourth quarter**

- IND – Rodrigo Blankenship 53-yard field goal, 13:31. Colts 20–13. **Drive: 6 plays, 40 yards, 2:48.**
- HOU – Keke Coutee 9-yard pass from Deshaun Watson (Kaʻimi Fairbairn kick), 7:25. Tied 20–20. **Drive: 10 plays, 80 yards, 6:06.**
- IND – Zach Pascal 5-yard pass from Philip Rivers (Rodrigo Blankenship kick), 1:47. Colts 27–20. **Drive: 12 plays, 75 yards, 5:38.**

**Top passers**

- HOU – Deshaun Watson – 33/41, 373 yards, 2 TD
- IND – Philip Rivers – 22/28, 228 yards, 2 TD

**Top rushers**

- HOU – David Johnson – 8 rushes, 27 yards
- IND – Jonathan Taylor – 16 rushes, 83 yards, TD

**Top receivers**

- HOU – David Johnson – 11 receptions, 106 yards
- IND – Zach Pascal – 5 receptions, 79 yards, 2 TD

==== Week 16: at Pittsburgh Steelers ====
Week 16: Indianapolis Colts at Pittsburgh Steelers – Game summary

Quarter	1	2	3	4	Total
Colts	7	14	3	0	**24**
**Steelers**	0	7	7	14	**28**

at Heinz Field, Pittsburgh, Pennsylvania

- Date: December 27
- Game time: 1:00 p.m. EST
- Game weather: Sunny, 37 °F (3 °C)
- Game attendance: 0
- Referee: Alex Kemp
- TV announcers (CBS): Jim Nantz, Tony Romo and Tracy Wolfson
- Recap, Game Book

Game information

**First quarter**

- IND – Jonathan Taylor 6-yard run (Rodrigo Blankenship kick), 9:48. Colts 7–0. **Drive: 9 plays, 70 yards, 4:45.**

**Second quarter**

- PIT – James Conner 1-yard run (Chris Boswell kick), 13:47. Tied 7–7. **Drive: 3 plays, 3 yards, 0:50.**
- IND – Jonathan Taylor 1-yard run (Rodrigo Blankenship kick), 6:35. Colts 14–7. **Drive: 12 plays, 85 yards, 7:12.**
- IND – Zach Pascal 42-yard pass from Philip Rivers, 4:02. Colts 21–7. **Drive: 2 plays, 43 yards, 0:48.**

**Third quarter**

- IND – Rodrigo Blankenship 28-yard field goal, 9:23. Colts 24–7. **Drive: 10 plays, 65 yards, 5:37.**
- PIT – Diontae Johnson 39-yard pass from Ben Roethlisberger (Chris Boswell kick), 3:16. Colts 24–14. **Drive: 1 play, 39 yards, 0:07.**

**Fourth quarter**

- PIT – Eric Ebron 5-yard pass from Ben Roethlisberger (Chris Boswell kick), 14:52. Colts 24–21. **Drive: 5 plays, 74 yards, 1:51.**
- PIT – JuJu Smith-Schuster 25-yard pass from Ben Roethlisberger (Chris Boswell kick), 7:38. Steelers 28–24. **Drive: 10 plays, 84 yards, 4:28.**

**Top passers**

- IND – Philip Rivers – 22/35, 270 yards, TD, INT
- PIT – Ben Roethlisberger – 34/49, 341 yards, 3 TD

**Top rushers**

- IND – Jonathan Taylor – 18 rushes, 74 yards, 2 TD
- PIT – James Conner – 5 rushes, 20 yards, TD

**Top receivers**

- IND – Zach Pascal – 3 receptions, 64 yards, TD
- PIT – JuJu Smith-Schuster – 9 receptions, 96 yards, TD

Initially seeded within the AFC playoff race, the Week 16 loss to the Pittsburgh Steelers knocked the Colts to the first seed outside looking in.

==== Week 17: vs. Jacksonville Jaguars ====
Week 17: Jacksonville Jaguars at Indianapolis Colts – Game summary

Quarter	1	2	3	4	Total
Jaguars	0	7	7	0	**14**
**Colts**	10	10	0	8	**28**

at Lucas Oil Stadium, Indianapolis, Indiana

- Date: January 3, 2021
- Game time: 4:25 p.m. EST
- Game weather: None (retractable roof closed)
- Game attendance: 9,976
- Referee: Shawn Smith
- TV announcers (CBS): Andrew Catalon, James Lofton and Sherree Burruss
- Recap, Game Book

Game information

**First quarter**

- IND – T. Y. Hilton 6-yard pass from Philip Rivers (Rodrigo Blankenship kick), 10:16. Colts 7–0. **Drive: 6 plays, 78 yards, 2:43.**
- IND – Rodrigo Blankenship 22-yard field goal, 1:16. Colts 10–0. **Drive: 13 plays, 80 yards, 7:26.**

**Second quarter**

- IND – Jonathan Taylor 1-yard run (Rodrigo Blankenship kick), 11:40. Colts 17–0. **Drive: 3 plays, 15 yards, 1:17.**
- IND – Rodrigo Blankenship 24-yard field goal, 2:38. Colts 20–0. **Drive: 7 plays, 43 yards, 3:43.**
- JAX – Laviska Shenault 9-yard pass from Mike Glennon (Aldrick Rosas kick), 0:27. Colts 20–7. **Drive: 7 plays, 75 yards, 2:11.**

**Third quarter**

- JAX – Laviska Shenault 8-yard pass from Mike Glennon (Aldrick Rosas kick), 6:26. Colts 20–14. **Drive: 10 plays, 61 yards, 5:41.**

**Fourth quarter**

- IND – Jonathan Taylor 45-yard run (Philip Rivers–T. Y. Hilton pass), 3:35. Colts 28–14. **Drive: 2 plays, 50 yards, 0:51.**

**Top passers**

- IND – Philip Rivers – 17/27, 164 yards, TD, INT
- JAX – Mike Glennon – 26/42, 261 yards, 2 TD

**Top rushers**

- IND – Jonathan Taylor – 30 rushes, 253 yards, 2 TD
- JAX – Dare Ogunbowale – 14 rushes, 50 yards

**Top receivers**

- IND – Nyheim Hines – 6 receptions, 50 yards
- JAX – Chris Conley – 7 receptions, 87 yards

As one of five AFC teams with a 10–5 record entering Week 17, the Colts were on the outside of the playoff picture until the Miami Dolphins fell to the Buffalo Bills earlier in the afternoon. The Colts held on for a 28–14 win to avoid being swept by the otherwise winless Jaguars. With the win and the Houston Texans' loss to the Tennessee Titans, the Colts finished the season with an 11–5 record and were eliminated from contention for the division title, but clinched the seventh and final wild card slot in the expanded NFL playoffs.

=== Standings ===
==== Division ====
AFC South
	W	L	T	PCT	DIV	CONF	PF	PA	STK
^{(4)} Tennessee Titans	11	5	0	.688	5–1	8–4	491	439	W1
^{(7)} Indianapolis Colts	11	5	0	.688	4–2	7–5	451	362	W1
Houston Texans	4	12	0	.250	2–4	3–9	384	464	L5
Jacksonville Jaguars	1	15	0	.063	1–5	1–11	306	492	L15

==== Conference ====
AFC
#	Team	Division	W	L	T	PCT	DIV	CONF	SOS	SOV	STK
**Division leaders**
1	Kansas City Chiefs	West	14	2	0	.875	4–2	10–2	.465	.464	L1
2	Buffalo Bills	East	13	3	0	.813	6–0	10–2	.512	.471	W6
3	Pittsburgh Steelers	North	12	4	0	.750	4–2	9–3	.475	.448	L1
4 (Note: Tennessee finished ahead of Indianapolis in the AFC South based on division record.)	Tennessee Titans	South	11	5	0	.688	5–1	8–4	.475	.398	W1
**Wild cards**
5 (Note: Baltimore claimed the No. 5 seed over Indianapolis based on head-to-head victory. Division tiebreaker used to eliminate Cleveland (see below).) (Note: Baltimore claimed the No. 5 seed over Cleveland based on head-to-head sweep.)	Baltimore Ravens	North	11	5	0	.688	4–2	7–5	.494	.401	W5
6 (Note: Cleveland claimed the No. 6 seed over Indianapolis based on head-to-head victory.)	Cleveland Browns	North	11	5	0	.688	3–3	7–5	.451	.406	W1
7	Indianapolis Colts	South	11	5	0	.688	4–2	7–5	.443	.384	W1
**Did not qualify for the postseason**
8	Miami Dolphins	East	10	6	0	.625	3–3	7–5	.467	.347	L1
9	Las Vegas Raiders	West	8	8	0	.500	4–2	6–6	.539	.477	W1
10 (Note: New England finished ahead of the LA Chargers based on head-to-head victory.)	New England Patriots	East	7	9	0	.438	3–3	6–6	.527	.429	W1
11	Los Angeles Chargers	West	7	9	0	.438	3–3	6–6	.482	.344	W4
12	Denver Broncos	West	5	11	0	.313	1–5	4–8	.566	.388	L3
13	Cincinnati Bengals	North	4	11	1	.281	1–5	4–8	.529	.438	L1
14	Houston Texans	South	4	12	0	.250	2–4	3–9	.541	.219	L5
15	New York Jets	East	2	14	0	.125	0–6	1–11	.594	.656	L1
16	Jacksonville Jaguars	South	1	15	0	.063	1–5	1–11	.549	.688	L15
**Tiebreakers** (Note: When breaking ties for three or more teams under the NFL's rules, they are first broken within divisions, then comparing only the highest ranked remaining team from each division.)

== Postseason ==
=== Schedule ===
Round	Date	Opponent (seed)	Result	Record	Venue	Recap
Wild Card	January 9, 2021	at Buffalo Bills (2)	L 24–27	0–1	Bills Stadium	Recap

=== Game summaries ===
==== AFC Wild Card Playoffs: at (2) Buffalo Bills ====
AFC Wild Card Playoffs: (7) Indianapolis Colts at (2) Buffalo Bills – Game summary

Quarter	1	2	3	4	Total
Colts	3	7	0	14	24
Bills	7	7	3	10	27

at Bills Stadium, Orchard Park, New York

- Date: January 9, 2021
- Game time: 1:05 p.m. EST
- Game weather: Sunny, 34 °F (1 °C)
- Game attendance: 6,772
- Referee: Brad Allen
- TV announcers (CBS): Ian Eagle, Charles Davis and Evan Washburn
- Recap, Game Book

Game information

First quarter

- IND – Rodrigo Blankenship 30-yard field goal, 5:29. Colts 3–0. Drive: 8 plays, 52 yards, 3:39.
- BUF – Dawson Knox 3-yard pass from Josh Allen (Tyler Bass kick), 1:49. Bills 7–3. Drive: 8 plays, 85 yards, 3:40.

Second quarter

- IND – Jonathan Taylor 1-yard run (Rodrigo Blankenship kick), 8:07. Colts 10–7. Drive: 9 plays, 65 yards, 5:27.
- BUF – Josh Allen 5-yard run (Tyler Bass kick), 0:14. Bills 14–10. Drive: 10 plays, 96 yards, 1:32.

Third quarter

- BUF – Tyler Bass 46-yard field goal, 11:05. Bills 17–10. Drive: 9 plays, 44 yards, 3:55.

Fourth quarter

- BUF – Stefon Diggs 35-yard pass from Josh Allen (Tyler Bass kick), 14:10. Bills 24–10. Drive: 9 plays, 77 yards, 4:22.
- IND – Zach Pascal 9-yard pass from Philip Rivers (run failed), 11:32. Bills 24–16. Drive: 7 plays, 75 yards, 2:38.
- BUF – Tyler Bass 54-yard field goal, 8:08. Bills 27–16. Drive: 7 plays, 39 yards, 3:24.
- IND – Jack Doyle 27-yard pass from Philip Rivers (Philip Rivers–Jack Doyle pass), 6:13. Bills 27–24. Drive: 5 plays, 76 yards, 1:55.

Top passers

- IND – Philip Rivers – 27/46, 309 yards, 2 TD
- BUF – Josh Allen – 26/35, 324 yards, 2 TD

Top rushers

- IND – Jonathan Taylor – 21 rushes, 78 yards, TD
- BUF – Josh Allen – 11 rushes, 54 yards, TD

Top receivers

- IND – Michael Pittman Jr. – 5 receptions, 90 yards
- BUF – Stefon Diggs – 6 receptions, 128 yards, TD

In what would be quarterback Philip Rivers' last game in the NFL until a short return for the 2025 season, the Colts fell to the Bills by a final score of 27–24 despite coming back from a 24–10 fourth-quarter deficit. Rivers threw for two fourth-quarter touchdowns and led another drive to the Bills' 47-yard line in the final two minutes, but the Colts were unable to score on the drive, sealing the win for the Bills.
