= Isaiah Rodgers =

American football player (born 1998)

Isaiah Rodgers Sr.
No. 2 – Minnesota Vikings
- Position: Cornerback
- Roster status: Active

Personal information
- Born: January 7, 1998 (age 28); Tampa, Florida, U.S.
- Listed height: 5 ft 10 in (1.78 m)
- Listed weight: 180 lb (82 kg)

Career information
- High school: Blake (Tampa)
- College: UMass (2016–2019)
- NFL draft: 2020: 6th round, 211th overall pick

Career history
- Indianapolis Colts (2020–2022); Philadelphia Eagles (2023–2024); Minnesota Vikings (2025–present)

Awards and highlights
- Super Bowl champion (LIX); PFWA All-Rookie Team (2020); NCAA kickoff return yards leader (2019); Second-team All-ECAC (2017)

Career NFL statistics as of Week 10, 2026
- Total tackles: 211
- Interceptions: 5
- Interception return yards: 111
- Pass deflections: 23
- Forced fumbles: 4
- Fumble recoveries: 6
- Return yards: 1,895
- Total touchdowns: 3
- Stats at Pro Football Reference

Isaiah Jamari Rodgers Sr. (born January 7, 1998) is an American professional football cornerback for the Minnesota Vikings of the National Football League (NFL). He played college football for the UMass Minutemen.

== Early life ==
Rodgers attended Blake High School in Tampa, Florida.

== College career ==
Rodgers played for the UMass Minutemen in college. He was named to Pro Football Focus' First-team All-American Team as a senior cornerback that could be moved to deep safety in special packages. That season, Rodgers had an NCAA-leading 53 kickoffs returned for 1,295 yards. On defense, he made 42 total tackles, four interceptions including one returned for a touchdown, ten passes defended and one forced fumble and fumble recovery. During his college career, Rodgers compiled 125 total tackles (9.5 for a loss) with 11 interceptions including three returned for a touchdown, and four fumble recoveries and forced fumbles. On special teams, he posted 99 total kickoff returns for 2,338 yards (23.6 average), in addition to 21 punt returns for 156 yards (7.4 average) and one touchdown. Rodgers held his own Pro Day after his senior season showcasing his defensive diversity at safety and defensive back; he ran a 4.28–second 40-yard dash.

== Professional career ==
Pre-draft measurables
Height	Weight	40-yard dash
5 ft 9 5/8 in (1.77 m)	170 lb (77 kg)	4.28 s
Values from Pro Day

=== Indianapolis Colts ===
Rodgers Sr. was selected by the Indianapolis Colts of the National Football League (NFL) with the 211th pick in the sixth round of the 2020 NFL draft in a pick acquired in a trade with the New York Jets in exchange for Quincy Wilson. Rodgers scored his first career touchdown on a 101-yard kick return in a Week 5 loss to the Cleveland Browns. He was named to the PFWA All-Rookie Team.

On December 28, 2022, the Colts placed Rodgers on season–ending injured reserve with a knee injury he suffered in Week 16 against the Los Angeles Chargers. He finished the year with 34 tackles, three pass breakups, a forced fumble, and a fumble recovery.

In June 2023, Rodgers was probed by the NFL for violations of the league's gambling policy. He was accused of opening a sportsbook account under the name of a personal associate and making roughly one hundred bets, including bets on his own team. On June 28, 2023, ESPN reported that Rodgers, among several other NFL players, would be suspended for the entirety of the 2023 NFL season for violating the league's policy on gambling. Shortly after the suspension was announced, Rodgers was waived by the Colts along with teammate Rashod Berry.

=== Philadelphia Eagles ===
On August 28, 2023, Rodgers was signed by the Philadelphia Eagles, but sat out the entire season due to his suspension. On April 23, 2024, Rodgers was reinstated by the NFL.

In Weeks 9 and 13 in 2024, Rodgers started in place of an injured Darius Slay, recording eight tackles across two Eagles wins. On the opening drive of the Eagles' Week 12 matchup against the Los Angeles Rams, Rodgers forced a fumble on running back Kyren Williams that was recovered by teammate Nakobe Dean for a turnover.

In a Divisional Playoff game against the Los Angeles Rams on January 19, 2025, with the Eagles clinging to a 16–15 lead in the 4th quarter, Rodgers recovered a fumble by Kyren Williams and returned it 40 yards to the Rams' 10-yard line, leading to a field goal that increased the Eagles lead to 19–15 in a game they eventually won 28–22. He had one pass defended in Super Bowl LIX, a 40–22 win over the Kansas City Chiefs.

=== Minnesota Vikings ===
On March 12, 2025, Rodgers signed with the Minnesota Vikings on a two-year, $15 million contract.

On September 21, 2025, in the first half of the Vikings' Week 3 matchup against the Cincinnati Bengals, Rodgers forced three turnovers while scoring two touchdowns as the Vikings won 48–10. Rodgers became the first Vikings player to score multiple defensive touchdowns in a game in franchise history, and the first player in NFL history to have an interception returned for a touchdown, a fumble returned for a touchdown, and force two fumbles in one game. For this performance, he won NFC Defensive Player of the Week and became the first player to ever receive a perfect 99.9 game score by Pro Football Focus (PFF) since the site began grading player performances in 2006.

On September 21, 2026, in a Week 2 9–3 victory against the arch-rival Chicago Bears, Rodgers blocked a pivotal fourth quarter field goal attempt as well as posting four tackles, a fumble recovery and a pass breakup, earning him NFC Special Teams Player of the Week.

== NFL career statistics ==
Legend
	Won the Super Bowl
	Led the league
**Bold**	Career high

=== Regular season ===
Year	Team	Games		Tackles					Interceptions						Punt returns					Kick returns					Fumbles					
Year	Team	GP	GS	Cmb	Solo	Ast	TfL	Sck	PD	Int	Yds	Avg	Lng	TD	Ret	Yds	Avg	Lng	TD	Ret	Yds	Avg	Lng	TD	FF	Fum	FR	Yds	Avg	TD
2020	IND	13	0	7	5	2	0	0.0	0	0	0	0.0	0	0	1	12	**12.0**	12	0	**24**	**692**	**28.8**	**101**	**1**	0	**1**	0	0	0.0	0
2021	IND	17	1	49	39	10	1	0.0	**7**	**3**	24	8.0	12	0	0	0	0.0	0	0	19	501	26.4	72	0	0	**1**	0	0	0.0	0
2022	IND	15	9	34	24	10	1	0.0	3	0	0	0.0	0	0	**2**	**13**	6.5	**13**	0	18	452	25.1	45	0	1	0	**4**	19	4.8	0
2024	PHI	15	3	26	17	9	0	0.0	4	0	0	0.0	0	0	0	0	0.0	0	0	8	225	28.1	51	0	1	0	0	0	0.0	0
2025	MIN	17	15	**66**	**47**	**19**	**4**	0.0	4	1	**87**	**87.0**	**87**	**1**	0	0	0.0	0	0	0	0	0.0	0	0	**2**	0	1	**66**	**66.0**	**1**
2026	MIN	9	9	29	14	15	0	0.0	5	1	0	0.0	0	0	0	0	0.0	0	0	0	0	0.0	0	0	0	0	1	0	0.0	0
Career		86	37	211	146	65	6	0.0	23	5	111	22.2	87	1	3	25	8.3	13	0	69	1870	27.1	101	1	4	2	6	85	17.0	1

=== Postseason ===
Year	Team	Games		Tackles					Interceptions						Kick returns					Fumbles					
Year	Team	GP	GS	Cmb	Solo	Ast	TfL	Sck	PD	Int	Yds	Avg	Lng	TD	Ret	Yds	Avg	Lng	TD	FF	Fum	FR	Yds	Avg	TD
2020	IND	1	0	0	0	0	0	0.0	1	0	0	0.0	0	0	2	59	**29.5**	**38**	0	0	0	0	0	0.0	0
2024	PHI	4	0	**6**	**5**	**1**	0	0.0	**3**	0	0	0.0	0	0	**4**	**103**	25.8	32	0	0	0	**1**	**40**	**40.0**	0
Career		5	0	6	5	1	0	0.0	4	0	0	0.0	0	0	6	162	27.0	38	0	0	0	1	0	0.0	0
