= Stride (surname) =

Stride may refer to:

- Darren Stride, (born 1975), English professional footballer
- David Stride, (born 1958), former English professional footballer
- Elizabeth Stride, (1843–1888), murder victim
- John Stride, (1936–2018), English actor
- Mel Stride, British politician
- Steve Stride, (born c.1950), former operations director of Aston Villa FC
- Virginia Stride, British actress
