= System to Retrieve Information from Drug Evidence =

The System to Retrieve Information from Drug Evidence (STRIDE) is a United States Drug Enforcement Administration (DEA) program consisting of six subsystems providing information on drug intelligence, statistics on markings found on pills and capsules, drug inventory, tracking, statistical information on drugs removed from the marketplace, utilization of laboratory manpower and information on subsystems analyzed outside of the DEA laboratory system where DEA participated in the seizures.

== Purpose ==
The system provides the medium for inputting, updating and displaying the results of analysis of substance evidence and for the characterization of physical and chemical characteristics of substance evidence to determine the origin of the evidence.

== Controversy ==
Academic uses of the STRIDE data to look for trends in pricing and other data has been criticized because the sampling entered into the system is limited to successful operations and is thus relatively small and not necessarily representative of the greater market.
