= Personal watercraft–related accidents =

Background of watercraft-related injuries

The number of personal watercraft-related accidents has increased with the popularity of personal watercraft (PWC) (also commonly known as jet skis) since their introduction during the late 1960s. The use of the term jet ski for all types of PWCs is a misnomer; Jet Ski is a registered trademark in the United States for a line of PWCs manufactured by Kawasaki. With the increased use of personal watercraft since their inception, the hazards accompanying their use have also increased. According to U.S. government reports, most accidents are associated with rental operators, underage operators, under-trained and undereducated boaters and a variety of factors associated with recreational-boating accidents (excessive speed, inattention, reckless operation, alcohol consumption and violations of the "Rules of the Road"). Due to their affordability, ease of use, and relatively low transportation and maintenance costs, personal watercraft have significantly increased the number of water-based enthusiasts in the U.S. This rise in participation has created conflicts between the various boating segments in the U.S. and a need for additional boater education. Recreational-boating accidents are the second-largest transportation-related cause of injury in the U.S. (after automobile accidents).

== Background ==
One-person watercraft are vessels designed for recreational use on the water, carrying between one and four passengers. The U.S. Coast Guard defines PWC as "craft less than 13 feet in length designed to be operated by a person or persons sitting, standing or kneeling on the craft rather than within the confines of a hull". The original PWCs were manufactured during the mid-1950s in the United Kingdom and Europe. Ten years later, Bombardier Recreational Products (BRP) began manufacturing PWCs in the USA under the name Sea-Doo. BRP left the PWC business shortly thereafter, and in 1973 Kawasaki introduced a "stand-up" watercraft designed for a single operator (with a tray for standing or kneeling, in place of a seat). By the late 1980s "sit-down" models had appeared on the market, allowing the rider to be seated (similar to a snowmobile or motorcycle seat). These sit-down models were made by Kawasaki (1986), Yamaha (1987) and BRP (1988). Polaris and Arctic were two American companies which entered the market during the early 1990s.

PWC have an inboard engine with a screw-shaped impeller to create thrust and propulsion for steering. They are small, fast, and easy to maneuver; PWCs do not use external propellers, making them safer for swimmers and wildlife. The user-friendly properties of PWCs have contributed to the increase in popularity amongst less-experienced watercraft users. To increase safety, a number of U.S. consumer groups suggested that all boats should utilize the jet-drive mechanism (also called a pump-jet) employed by PWC manufacturers since this would reduce the risk of propeller injuries.

== Accidents ==
All boating accidents in the United States either occur on state- or federally-patrolled waters. Whether state or federal, reports must be filed for a predefined level of damage and are compiled by the United States Coast Guard (which uses the reported data for its annual BAR—Boating Accident Report—Statistical Reports). As automotive law-enforcement officers outnumber boating law-enforcement officers in the U.S., federal government reports for watercraft are comparatively fewer. The National Transportation Safety Board (NTSB) conducted general investigation of the recreational-boating accident-reporting system in 1998 and compiled its findings in a published report. The NTSB's investigation emerged with data seen as representative of overall recreational boating; an example follows from the report's conclusion:

Inattention (attributed to 307 operators), inexperience (attributed to 296 operators), and inappropriate speed for the operating conditions (attributed to 246 operators) were the most frequently cited causes that contributed to the PWC accidents. One or more of these three causes were associated with 70 percent of the 814 accidents. A fourth cause, improper lookout (153), was associated with about one-fifth of the accidents.

According to the aforementioned interpretation of the NTSB report:

- The vast majority of accidents (over 90 percent) were caused by operator error.
- There is a significantly higher association with accidents for rental operators (nearly 25 percent) than is the case for the general boating population; however, this may be related to the higher percentage of rental operators.
- The NTSB report did not conclude that PWCs are disproportionately represented in boating-accident statistics.

A study performed by the Red Cross in 1991 concluded that during the research period, PWC accidents were not disproportionate to their use by the boating population. This was later supported by a Coast Guard study presented to the State of Vermont in 1996. Both studies presented findings that the comparative accident rates for personal water craft were not disproportionate to their use by the boating population; the reports emphasized the high level of attention and publicity that PWC accidents receive.

During the late 1990s, several states (including California and Florida, two jurisdictions which, according to the NTSB report, accounted for over 50 percent of all personal watercraft accidents in the U.S.) changed their laws regarding the use of personal water craft. These amendments included the introduction of limits for wake-jumping, the prescribed use of a PWC within 100 feet (30 m) of another vessel, "spraying" activities, mandated operation of PWCs within 150 feet (46 m) of the shoreline, and age restrictions for operators (the operator age was raised from 12 to 16 years for all affected states, with Florida also introducing a mandatory boating-safety course for those under age 18). According to the State of California, these laws have directly contributed to an over-50-percent reduction in accidents.

A notable fatality occurred on July 1, 2012, in Little Sabine Bay (near Pensacola Beach), Florida; retired astronaut Alan Poindexter was killed when the PWC he was riding was rammed by one operated by one of his sons.

== Causes ==
=== Reckless driving ===
The leading cause of PWC accidents among riders in 2007 was reckless or careless driving. According to the National Transportation Safety Board in the U.S., this accounted for 26.3 percent of all PWCs involved in accidents in 2007. Reckless driving has been defined in the Personal Watercraft Act of 2005 in the U.S. as follows:

Every personal watercraft shall at all times be operated in a reasonable and prudent manner. No person shall operate a personal watercraft in an unsafe or reckless manner. Unsafe personal watercraft operation shall include, but not be limited to the following:

(1) Becoming airborne or completely leaving the water while crossing the wake of another vessel within [100 feet] of the vessel creating the wake.
Or wake jumping

(2) Weaving through congested traffic.
(3) Operating a vessel at greater than slow/no wake speed within [100 feet] of an anchored or moored vessel, shoreline, vessel underway, dock, pier, boat ramp, marina, swim float, marked swim area, person in the water, person(s) engaged in angling, or any manually-propelled vessel.
(4) Operating contrary to the "Rules of the Road" or following to close to another vessel, including another personal watercraft. For the purposes of this section, following too close shall be construed as proceeding in the same direction and operating at a speed in excess of [10 MPH] when approaching within [100 feet] to the rear or [50 feet] to the side of another motorboat or sailboat which is underway unless such vessel is operating in a narrow channel, in which case a personal watercraft may operate at speed and flow of other vessel traffic.

Reckless driving is defined differently by state. For example, in Florida reckless driving on a PWC is defined as "maneuvering a personal watercraft by weaving through congested vessel traffic, jumping the wake of another vessel unreasonably close or when visibility around the vessel is obstructed, or swerving at the last possible moment to avoid collision is classified as reckless operation of a vessel".

In U.S. law, the penalties for operating a vessel in a negligent or reckless manner are defined as following:

(a) A person operating a vessel in a negligent manner or interfering with the safe operation of a vessel, so as to endanger the life, limb, or property of a person is liable to the United States Government for a civil penalty of not more than $5,000 in the case of a recreational vessel, or $25,000 in the case of any other vessel.
(b) A person operating a vessel in a grossly negligent manner that endangers the life, limb, or property of a person commits a class A misdemeanor.

=== Driver inattention ===
Because of the increasing popularity of water sports (particularly PWC), the number of vessels in use has increased in the last several decades. According to the U.S. Coast Guard, the number of registered vessels was 8,557,857 in 1980 and 12,875,568 in 2007. This has resulted in more-crowded waterways and increased hazards. Because of the increased congestion caused by the number of vessels, a heightened need for attention and caution is required by operators. In 2007, 17.2 percent of all PWC-related accidents were caused by driver inattention.

=== Excessive speed ===
As the market has grown for PWC manufacturers, vessel power has also increased. Modern PWC engines have more than 250 horsepower and can reach speeds of over 60 miles per hour (97 km/h). Excessive speed accounted for nearly 15 percent of all PWC-related accidents in 2007, according to the U.S. Coast Guard. From January–June 1997, there were 114 accidents from speed alone. Reports show half were traveling more than 20 mph.

=== Off-throttle steering ===
The steering characteristics of jet boats (including personal watercraft) when they are off-throttle seem to differ from conventional steering. All recreational planing boats steer with thrust. Jet boats (including PWCs) generate that thrust with a moveable nozzle connected to a jet pump; propeller boats generate thrust through a downward-placed, exposed propeller. The fact that the propeller is placed downward in the water and is exposed means that even when it is not generating thrust that some amount of steering effect is possible. Jet boats have no downward projection, and achieve no additional steering effect from the device. If the operator of a jet boat releases the throttle, steering effectiveness decreases roughly in proportion to thrust reduction. The NTSB related an example of an off-throttle steering accident in the personal watercraft safety study of 1998:

The Florida Marine Patrol accident description states, "[Operator] was attempting to make a turn south through a cut in the mangroves . . . . He was not real familiar with operating a jet ski with a passenger. When he attempted to make a left turn he let off the throttle which caused the PWC to lose steering capabilities. The forward momentum of the PWC took [operator] and passenger into the mangrove shoreline. [Operator] received a puncture wound to the left side of his neck . . . ."

According to the NTSB, 24 percent of reported PWC accidents list steering problems or loss of control as contributing factors; in Florida, it is the second-leading cause of PWC-related accidents. PWC manufacturers have been working to develop a system to prevent off-throttle steering. Modifications have been made to solve this problem in newer PWC models.

=== Driver inexperience ===
Because of the ease of operating a PWC, little training and experience is required to perform basic maneuvers of a PWC. The NTSB reported in 1998 that 32 percent of operators involved in accidents reported that they had operated a vessel between zero and ten times prior to the accident; 86 never, 75 once and 225 between two and ten times. Of the 712 operators who were asked about training, 84 percent said they had received no training and the other 16 percent participated in some boating training. Regulations concerning training courses and age limits for operators vary by state and by country. In the U.S. the minimum operator age ranges from 12–18 years; young operators may require adult supervision on the vessel and training in accordance with local laws.

=== Internal orifice injuries ===
One particularly serious type of personal watercraft injury, known as PWC internal orifice injuries or Jet Ski vaginal/rectal injuries, occurs when a female rider falls off the back of the craft and into the path of the craft's high-pressure water jet. The jet thrust is powerful enough to push water into the rider's body orifices, which can result in severe internal injuries to the rider's vagina, rectum or anus, and possibly death. Oftentimes, individuals sustaining such injuries require urgent life-saving medical intervention, including the surgical implantation of a colostomy bag.

For example, in 2014, the California Court of Appeal for the Fourth Appellate District, Division One upheld in full a San Diego County jury verdict against Bombardier Recreational Products and two other defendants in favor of two plaintiffs injured simultaneously in a single 2007 fall from a PWC, which included awards, respectively, of $3.385 million and $1.063 million in compensatory damages (with liability divided in equal portions among the three defendants). The appellate court also affirmed awards of $1.5 million in punitive damages against BRP alone for each plaintiff (adding up to $3 million in punitive damages) which were based on the jury's express finding that BRP's conduct manifested a "reckless or callous disregard for the rights of others".

However, on the other hand, there are also examples where the owner, operator, and/or user of the personal watercraft have been found entirely at fault by a jury without any fault whatsoever on the manufacturer. For example, in 2010 in a case argued in the federal court of the Middle District of Florida, a jury found the 2006 Sea-Doo safe and not defective as to design, warnings, manufacture, and that BRP was not negligent in the design of its product. BRP maintained the Sea-Doo was reasonably safe, state-of-the-art, compliant with industry standards as well as the U.S. Coast Guard's standards, and was not the cause of plaintiff's injuries and/or accident. The plaintiff testified she did not have any conversation with anyone concerning the use of protective gear, such as wet suit bottoms or equivalent protective clothing and was not provided any safety information before riding. During the trial, the operator admitted he saw, but chose not to read, the onboard warning label. He also admitted that he did not read the safety recommendations in the operator's guide nor watch the safety video. Counsel for BRP in the Thomas case, Scott Sarason, commented on the case that, "Statistically speaking, the probability of the type of incident involved in this case is extremely rare. Owners, operators and passengers of personal watercraft must think safety first. It's important for people to realize that these watercraft are classified as boats. That's why the watercraft industry has been working diligently with authorities like the U.S. Coast Guard to introduce programs like 'Know Before You Go' in an effort to prevent accidents and injuries." The Thomas case is just one example, of a handful, where such a rare accident is caused by extraneous persons or factors (including, but not limited to, the presence of alcohol, operator inexperience/inattention, careless or reckless operation, violation of state/local boating laws, failure on the part of the operator and/or owner to convey necessary safety information provided by the manufacturer, etc.).
