= 92.1 FM =

FM radio frequency

The following radio stations broadcast on FM frequency 92.1 MHz:

== Argentina ==
- Bella Vista in Bella Vista, Corrientes
- Cadena 3 Villa Mercedes in Villa Mercedes, San Luis
- Cielo in Salta
- Concierto in San Genaro, Santa Fe
- Estación Serrano in Serrano, Córdoba
- Frecuencia 92 in Villa de Soto, Córdoba
- LRP442 de la ciudad in Pigüé, Buenos Aires
- La Voz del Cerro in San Salvador de Jujuy, Jujuy
- La 100 San Nicolás in San Nicolás de los Arroyos, Buenos Aires
- Libertad in Victoria, Entre Rìos
- LRA 10 Radio Nacional Ushuaia in Ushuaia, Tierra del Fuego
- LRI 402 Monumental in Alcorta, Santa Fe
- Me gusta in Cipolletti, Río Negro
- Radio María in Mar del Plata, Buenos Aires
- Radio María in Carlos Casares, Buenos Aires
- Radio María in Arrecifes, Buenos Aires
- Radio María in Trenque Lauquen, Buenos Aires
- Radio María in Villa Dolores, Córdoba
- Radio María in Villa Huidobro, Córdoba
- Radio María in Nogoyá, Entre Ríos
- Radio María in Villa Aberastain - La Rinconada, San Juan
- Radio María in San Vicente, Misiones
- Radio María in Cafayate, Salta
- Radio María in Rufino, Santa Fe
- Red 92 in La Plata, Buenos Aires
- Tiempo in Santa Teresita, Buenos Aires
- Tu Lugar in Playa Unión, Chubut
- Uno in Tres Arroyos, Buenos Aires
- XLW in San Luis

== Australia ==
- 2ARM in Armidale, New South Wales
- 2MFM in Sydney, New South Wales
- ABC Western Plains in Lightning Ridge, New South Wales
- Radio National in Lithgow, New South Wales
- 7XS in Queenstown, Tasmania
- 7THE in Hobart, Tasmania
- ABC Classic in Warrnambool, Victoria
- ABC NewsRadio in Albany, Western Australia
- 6RTR in Perth, Western Australia

== Barbados ==
- BBC World Series Service

== Canada (Channel 221) ==
- CBHY-FM in Yarmouth, Nova Scotia
- CBIS-FM in Sydney, Nova Scotia
- CBNX-FM in St. Vincent's, Newfoundland and Labrador
- CBRI-FM in Etzikom, Alberta
- CBTC-FM in McBride, British Columbia
- CBU-FM-1 in Victoria, British Columbia
- CBXO-FM in Ocean Falls, British Columbia
- CFCC-FM in Guyer, Quebec
- CFFC-FM in Fox Creek, Alberta
- CFGA-FM in Brisay, Quebec
- CFGR-FM in Kangiqsualujjuaq, Quebec
- CFMM-FM-1 in Waskesiu Lake, Saskatchewan
- CFNR-FM in Terrace, British Columbia
- CFVD-FM-2 in Pohenegamook, Quebec
- CFVD-FM-3 in Squatec, Quebec
- CHMX-FM in Regina, Saskatchewan
- CHOD-FM in Cornwall, Ontario
- CHPL-FM in Plamondon, Alberta
- CIHO-FM-2 in Baie St-Paul, Quebec
- CITI-FM in Winnipeg, Manitoba
- CJAY-FM in Calgary, Alberta
- CJDM-FM in Drummondville, Quebec
- CJQQ-FM in Timmins, Ontario
- CJSC-FM in Campement Sarcelle, Quebec
- CJTI-FM in Temagami, Ontario
- CKKX-FM-1 in Manning, Alberta
- CKLA-FM in La Crete, Alberta
- CKPC-FM in Brantford, Ontario
- CKVM-1-FM in Temiscaming, Quebec
- CKYL-FM-2 in High Prairie, Alberta
- VF2239 in Parent, Quebec
- VF2450 in Voisey Bay, Newfoundland and Labrador
- VF2473 in Fraser Lake, British Columbia
- VF2562 in Shellbrook, Saskatchewan
- VF2564 in Princeton, British Columbia
- VF8011 in St-Georges-de-Beauce, Quebec

== China ==
- CNR Music Radio in Wenzhou

== Israel ==
- Kol BaRama

== Japan ==
- RBCi Radio in Naha, Okinawa

== Kosovo ==
- 92.1 Capital FM in Drenica, Gllogoc

== Malaysia ==
- Ai FM in Ipoh, Perak
- Johor FM in Eastern Johor
- Nasional FM in Sandakan, Sabah

== Mexico ==
- XHACD-FM in Acapulco, Guerrero
- XHANZ-FM in Manzanillo, Colima
- XHAZN-FM in Apatzingán, Michoacán
- XHCCBQ-FM in Chetumal, Quintana Roo
- XHEG-FM in Puebla, Puebla
- XHFO-FM in Mexico City
- XHGBO-FM in General Bravo, Nuevo León
- XHGML-FM in Guamúchil, Sonora
- XHHC-FM in Ensenada, Baja California
- XHITD-FM in Durango, Durango
- XHMYL-FM in Mérida, Yucatán
- XHOBS-FM in Ciudad Obregón, Sonora
- XHOJF-FM in Ocotlán de Morelos, Oaxaca
- XHPEDL-FM in Ciudad Delicias, Chihuahua
- XHPEFQ-FM in Saltillo, Coahuila
- XHPG-FM in Córdoba, Veracruz
- XHPMAZ-FM in Mazatlán, Sinaloa
- XHPUV-FM in Putla de Guerrero, Oaxaca
- XHSI-FM in Santiago Ixcuintla, Nayarit
- XHSMA-FM in San Miguel Allende, Guanajuato
- XHUX-FM in Tepic, Nayarit
- XHZTA-FM in Zihuatanejo, Guerrero

== Philippines ==
- DYIP in Calbayog, Samar
- DZYM-FM in San Jose, Occidental Mindoro
- DXGT in Maramag, Bukidnon

== Tonga ==
- China Radio International

== United Kingdom ==
- Wirral Radio in Wirral, England
- BBC Radio 3 in Haslingden, England
- BBC Radio 3 in Ivybridge, England
- BBC Radio 3 in Olivers Mount, England
- BBC Radio 3 in Tafton Hill, England
- BBC Radio 3 in Woodchurch, England
- BBC Radio 3 in Glasgow, Scotland
- BBC Radio 3 in Wenvoe, Wales
- BBC Three Counties Radio in Bedmond, England

== United States (Channel 221) ==
- KAGR-LP in Arapahoe, Nebraska
- KARJ in Escondido, California
- KATK in Carlsbad, New Mexico
- KBBO in Houston, Alaska
- KCAF-FM in Kenedy, Texas
- KCCA-LP in Anthony, Kansas
- KCHE in Cherokee, Iowa
- KCMT in Green Valley, Arizona
- KCRK in Colville, Washington
- KCVZ in Dixon, Missouri
- KCWB in Byron, Wyoming
- KCZO in Carrizo Springs, Texas
- KDQN-FM in De Queen, Arkansas
- KFRZ in Green River, Wyoming
- KFXI in Marlow, Oklahoma
- KGDL in Trent, Texas
- KHOS-FM in Sonora, Texas
- KHPQ in Clinton, Arkansas
- KIBX in Bonners Ferry, Idaho
- KIDG in Pocatello, Idaho
- KJMN in Castle Rock, Colorado
- KKDV in Walnut Creek, California
- KKOZ-FM in Ava, Missouri
- KLIL in Moreauville, Louisiana
- KLQP in Madison, Minnesota
- KMEE in Thermal, California
- KMFC in Centralia, Missouri
- KMOE in Butler, Missouri
- KMZA in Seneca, Kansas
- KNBT in New Braunfels, Texas
- KOPY-FM in Alice, Texas
- KORN-FM in Parkston, South Dakota
- KPSL in Bakersfield, California
- KPVC-LP in Dallas, Texas
- KQCM in Joshua Tree, California
- KQKZ in Bakersfield, California
- KQSM in Fayetteville, Arkansas
- KRAT in Sparks, Nevada
- KRDA in Clovis, California
- KREP in Belleville, Kansas
- KRLS in Knoxville, Iowa
- KROI in Seabrook, Texas
- KRUE in Waseca, Minnesota
- KRWR in Tyler, Texas
- KSBS in Pago Pago, American Samoa
- KSYD in Reedsport, Oregon
- KTBT in Broken Arrow, Oklahoma
- KTCE in Payson, Utah
- KTFW in Glen Rose, Texas
- KTHN in La Junta, Colorado
- KTSR in De Quincy, Louisiana
- KULD-LP in Laredo, Texas
- KUMA-FM in Pilot Rock, Oregon
- KUOS-LP in Sedona, Arizona
- KUUU in Tooele, Utah
- KVCL-FM in Winnfield, Louisiana
- KVFZ in Benton, Louisiana
- KVMX-FM in Placerville, California
- KWJD-LP in Onalaska, Washington
- KWVR-FM in Enterprise, Oregon
- KXBN in Cedar City, Utah
- KXDE-LP in Denton, Texas
- KXEZ in Farmersville, Texas
- KXJO in St. Maries, Idaho
- KXWR-LP in Tsaile, Arizona
- KYLR in Hutto, Texas
- KZBX-LP in Williams, Arizona
- KZLB in Fort Dodge, Iowa
- KZRX in Dickinson, North Dakota
- KZTZ in Cottonwood, California
- KZUA in Holbrook, Arizona
- WAFZ in Immokalee, Florida
- WBHC in Hampton, South Carolina
- WBIK in Pleasant City, Ohio
- WBKN in Brookhaven, Mississippi
- WBST in Muncie, Indiana
- WBTR in Carrollton, Georgia
- WBVX in Carlisle, Kentucky
- WCDX in Mechanicsville, Virginia
- WCFJ in Irmo, South Carolina
- WCGF in Ellwood City, Pennsylvania
- WCKR in Hornell, New York
- WCSR in Hillsdale, Michigan
- WCTQ in Venice, Florida
- WDDQ in Adel, Georgia
- WDER-FM in Peterborough, New Hampshire
- WDIC in Clinchco, Virginia
- WDLA in Walton, New York
- WECQ in Destin, Florida
- WEMQ-LP in Horsham, Pennsylvania
- WEUZ in Minor Hill, Tennessee
- WFOV-LP in Flint, Michigan
- WFPS in Freeport, Illinois
- WGHN in Grand Haven, Michigan
- WGYT-LP in Greer, South Carolina
- WHBT-FM in Moyock, North Carolina
- WHHR in Vienna, Georgia
- WHPD in Dowagiac, Michigan
- WIDL in Cass City, Michigan
- WIKG in Mercersburg, Pennsylvania
- WJGA in Jackson, Georgia
- WJHT in Johnstown, Pennsylvania
- WJJN (FM) in Columbia, Alabama
- WJMG in Hattiesburg, Mississippi
- WJNS-FM in Yazoo City, Mississippi
- WJPL-LP in Barre, Vermont
- WJXR in Macclenny, Florida
- WKHL in Palmyra, Pennsylvania
- WKUL in Cullman, Alabama
- WKXY in Merigold, Mississippi
- WKYF in Fredonia, Kentucky
- WLBW in Fenwick Island, Delaware
- WLHR-FM in Lavonia, Georgia
- WLNG in Sag Harbor, New York
- WLTU in Manitowoc, Wisconsin
- WMEQ in Menomonie, Wisconsin
- WMIS in Blackduck, Minnesota
- WMNC in Morganton, North Carolina
- WMOO in Derby Center, Vermont
- WMSU in Starkville, Mississippi
- WMYB in Myrtle Beach, South Carolina
- WNKU-LP in Covington, Kentucky
- WOHF in Bellevue, Ohio
- WOLF in Baldwinsville, New York
- WOMR in Provincetown, Massachusetts
- WPEH in Louisville, Georgia
- WPKC-FM in Sanford, Maine
- WPRY in Perry, Florida
- WPTS in Pittsburgh, Pennsylvania
- WQFM in Nanticoke, Pennsylvania
- WQKQ in Dallas City, Illinois
- WQQK in Goodlettsville, Tennessee
- WQTX in Saint Johns, Michigan
- WRJC-FM in Mauston, Wisconsin
- WRNQ in Poughkeepsie, New York
- WROI in Rochester, Indiana
- WROU in West Carrollton, Ohio
- WRSV in Elm City, North Carolina
- WSGJ-LP in Bowling Green, Kentucky
- WSQV in Lock Haven, Pennsylvania
- WSVQ-LP in Charleston West Side, West Virginia
- WTKY in Tompkinsville, Kentucky
- WTWS in Harrison, Michigan
- WUMS in University, Mississippi
- WUPI in Presque Isle, Maine
- WVET-LP in Fort McCoy, Florida
- WVLT in Vineland, New Jersey
- WVTK in Port Henry, New York
- WVTY in Racine, Wisconsin
- WVWC in Buckhannon, West Virginia
- WWPE-FM in Hermantown, Minnesota
- WWBJ-LP in Hillsboro, Ohio
- WWGO in Charleston, Illinois
- WXPS-LP in Spartanburg, South Carolina
- WXXM in Sun Prairie, Wisconsin
- WYAS (FM) in Luquillo, Puerto Rico
- WYRQ in Little Falls, Minnesota
- WYVK in Middleport, Ohio
- WZDM in Vincennes, Indiana
- WZDV in Amherst, New York
- WZET in Hormigueros, Puerto Rico
- WZEW in Fairhope, Alabama
- WZZR in West Palm Beach, Florida
