= Indianapolis Colts =

NFL team in Indianapolis, Indiana

- Current season
Logo	Wordmark
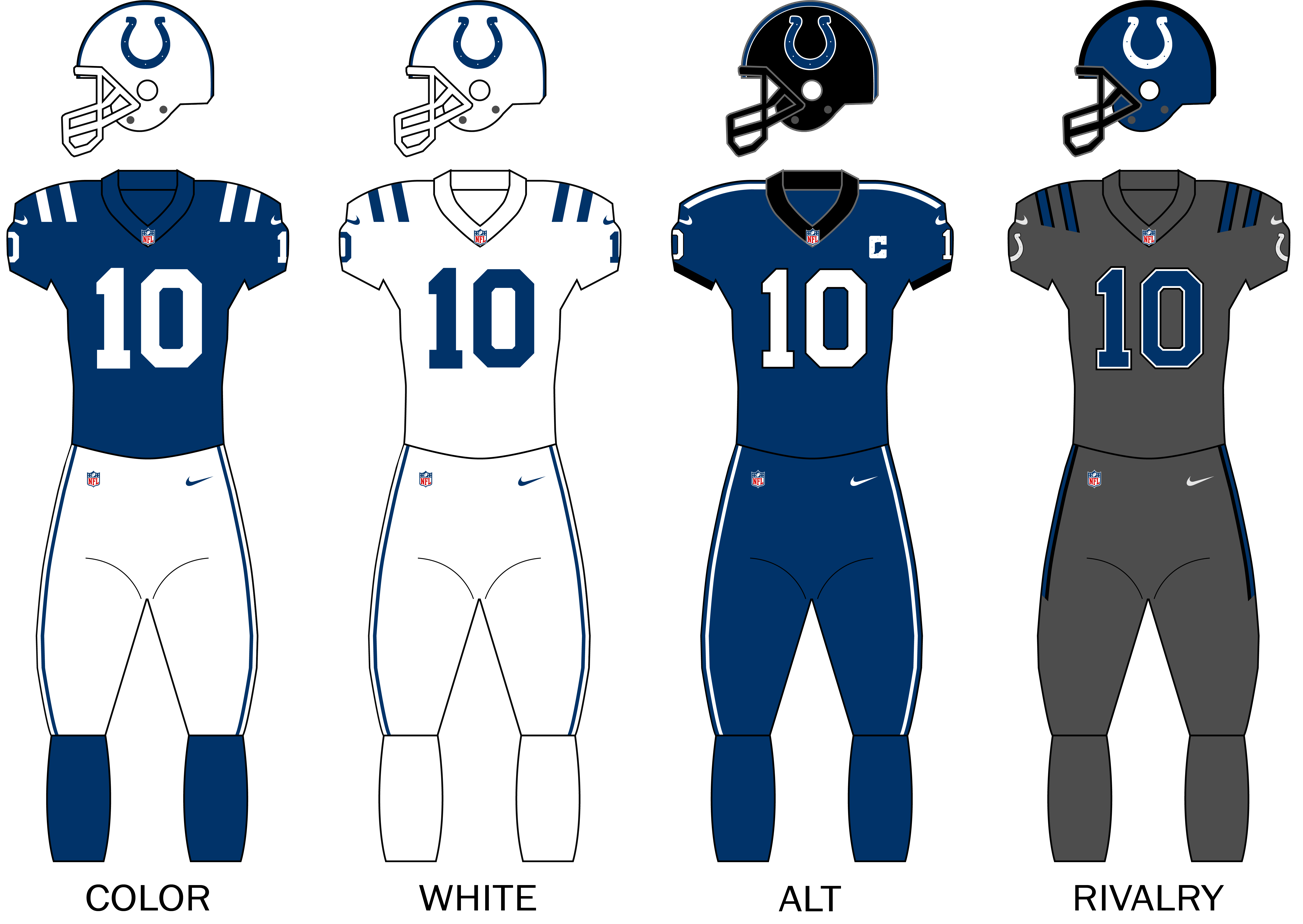
- Uniforms

General information
- Founded: January 23, 1953; 73 years ago
- Stadium: Lucas Oil Stadium; Indianapolis, Indiana
- Headquartered: The Indiana Farm Bureau Football Center, Indianapolis, Indiana
- Colors: Speed blue, white, facemask gray, anvil black
- Mascot: Blue
- Website: colts.com

Personnel
- Owner: Carlie Irsay-Gordon
- General manager: Ed Dodds (interim)
- Head coach: Shane Steichen

Team history
- Baltimore Colts (1953–1983); Indianapolis Colts (1984–present)

Home fields
- Baltimore Memorial Stadium (1953–1983); RCA Dome (1984–2007); Lucas Oil Stadium (2008–present)

League / conference affiliations
- National Football League (1953–present): Western Conference (1953–1969); Coastal Division (1967–1969); American Football Conference (1970–present); AFC East (1970–2001); AFC South (2002–present)

Championships
- League championships: 4†: NFL championships (pre-1970 AFL–NFL merger) (3) 1958, 1959, 1968; Super Bowl championships: 2 1970 (V), 2006 (XLI); † – Does not include 1968 NFL championship won during the same season that the Super Bowl was contested
- Conference championships: 7: NFL Western: 1958, 1959, 1964, 1968; AFC: 1970, 2006, 2009
- Division championships: 16: NFL Coastal: 1968; AFC East: 1970, 1975, 1976, 1977, 1987, 1999; AFC South: 2003, 2004, 2005, 2006, 2007, 2009, 2010, 2013, 2014

Playoff appearances (29)
- NFL: 1958, 1959, 1964, 1965, 1968, 1970, 1971, 1975, 1976, 1977, 1987, 1995, 1996, 1999, 2000, 2002, 2003, 2004, 2005, 2006, 2007, 2008, 2009, 2010, 2012, 2013, 2014, 2018, 2020

Owners
- Carroll Rosenbloom (1953–1972); Robert Irsay (1972–1997); Jim Irsay (1997–2025); Carlie Irsay-Gordon (2025–present)

The Indianapolis Colts are a professional American football team based in Indianapolis. The Colts compete in the National Football League (NFL) as a member of the American Football Conference (AFC) South division. Since the 2008 season, the Colts have played their games in Lucas Oil Stadium. Previously, the team had played for over two decades (1984–2007) at the RCA Dome. Since 1987, the Colts have served as the host team for the NFL Scouting Combine.

The Colts have competed as a member club of the NFL since their founding in Baltimore, Maryland, in 1953, after then-owner Carroll Rosenbloom purchased the assets of the NFL's last founding Ohio League member Dayton Triangles–Dallas Texans franchise. They were one of three NFL teams to join those of the American Football League (AFL) to form the AFC after the 1970 merger. While in Baltimore, the team advanced to the playoffs ten times and won three NFL Championship games in 1958, 1959, and 1968. The Baltimore Colts played in two Super Bowl games, losing to the New York Jets in Super Bowl III and defeating the Dallas Cowboys in Super Bowl V. The Colts moved to Indianapolis in 1984 and have since appeared in the playoffs eighteen times, won two conference championships, and played in two Super Bowl games; they defeated the Chicago Bears in Super Bowl XLI, and lost to the New Orleans Saints in Super Bowl XLIV.

== History ==
=== Baltimore Colts ===
The All America Football Conference began play in the 1946 season. In its second year, the franchise assigned to the Miami Seahawks was moved to Maryland's major commercial and manufacturing city of Baltimore. After a fan contest, the team was renamed the Baltimore Colts after the city's history of horse breeding and racing. The team used silver and green as its colors. The Colts played for the next three seasons in the old AAFC until they agreed to merge with the old National Football League (of 1920–1922 to 1950) when the NFL was reorganized. The Baltimore Colts were one of the three former AAFC powerhouse teams to merge with the NFL at that time, the others being the San Francisco 49ers and the Cleveland Browns. This Colts team, now in the "big league" of professional American football for the first time, although with shaky financing and ownership, played only in the 1950 season of the NFL, and was later disbanded.

=== Carroll Rosenbloom era (1953–1971) ===
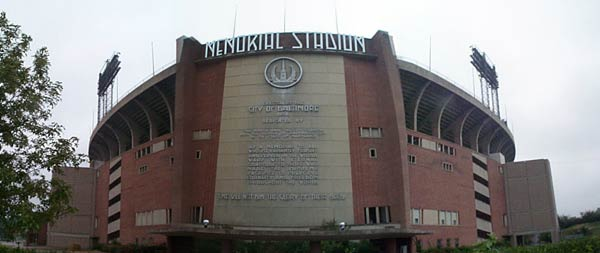
Memorial Stadium, home to the Baltimore Colts until 1983.

In 1953, a new Baltimore-based group, heavily supported by the city's municipal government and with a large subscription-base of fan-purchased season tickets, led by local owner Carroll Rosenbloom won the rights to a new Baltimore NFL franchise.

Rosenbloom was awarded the remains of the former Dallas Texans team, who themselves had a long and winding history, with a small part of the franchise starting as the Boston Yanks in 1944, merging later with the Brooklyn Tigers, a franchise that had a far more deep and rich history, being previously known as the Dayton Triangles, one of the original old NFL teams established even before the League itself, in 1913. That team later became the New York Yanks in 1950, and many of the players from the New York Yankees of the former competing All-America Football Conference (1946–49) were added to the team to begin playing in the newly merged League for the 1950 season. The Yanks then moved to Dallas in Texas after the 1951 season having competed for two seasons, but played their final two "home" games of the 1952 season as a so-called "road team" at the Rubber Bowl football stadium in Akron, Ohio.

The NFL considers the Texans and Colts to be separate teams, although many of the earlier teams shared the same colors of blue and white. Thus, the Indianapolis Colts are legally considered to be a 1953 expansion team.

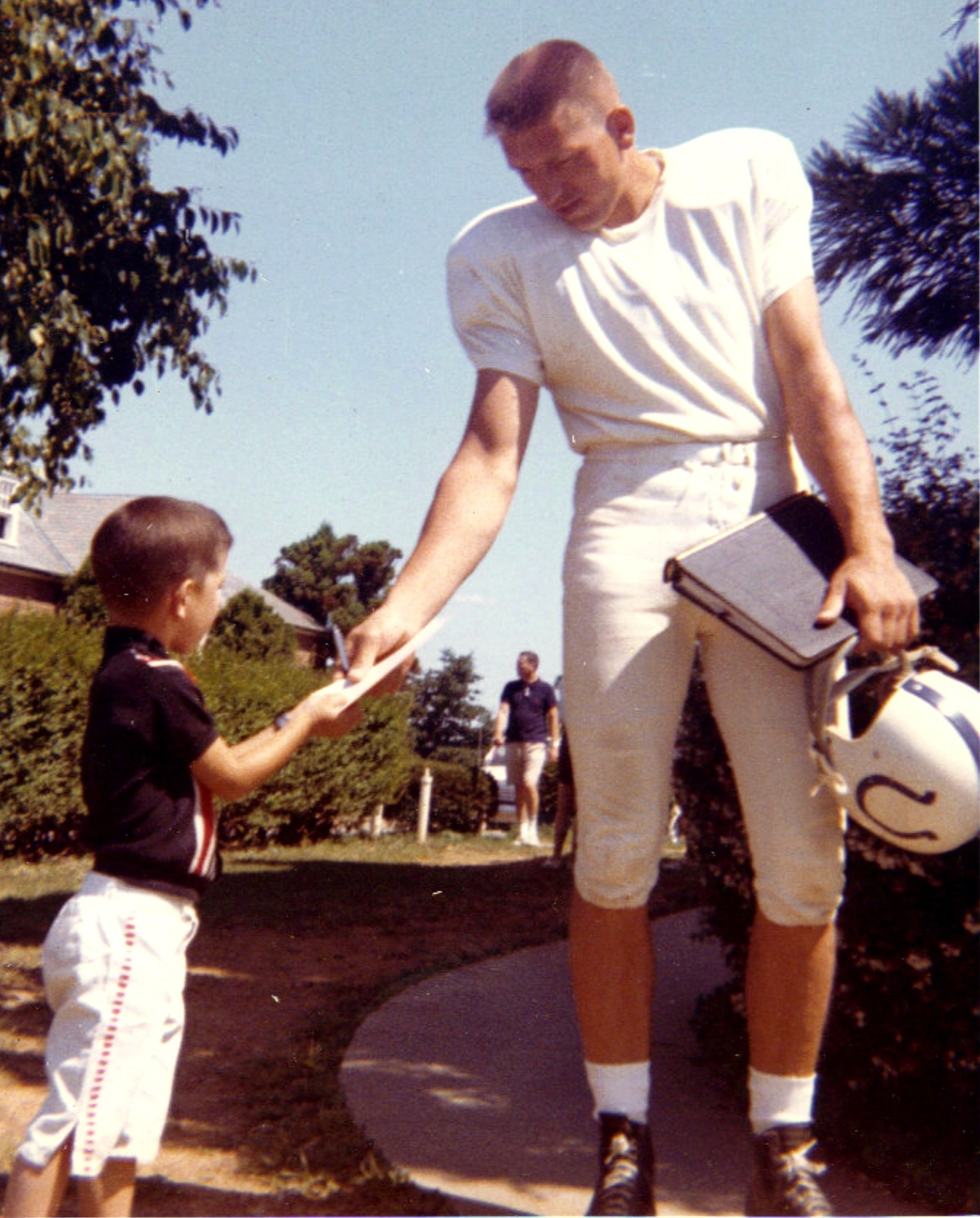
Pro Football Hall of Fame inductee Johnny Unitas (1933–2002), was the Baltimore Colts' starting quarterback and famed "Number 19" from 1956 to 1972.

==== Weeb Ewbank years (1954–1962) ====
The current version of the Colts football team played their first season in Baltimore in 1953, where the team compiled a 3–9 record under first-year head coach Keith Molesworth. The franchise struggled during the first few years in Baltimore, with the team not achieving their first winning record until the 1957 season.

===== NFL champions (1958–1959) =====
However, under head coach Weeb Ewbank and the leadership of quarterback Johnny Unitas, the Colts went on to a 9–3 record during the 1958 season and reached the NFL Championship Game for the first time by winning the NFL Western Conference. The Colts faced the New York Giants in the 1958 NFL Championship Game, which is considered to be among the greatest contests in professional football history. The Colts defeated the Giants 23–17 in the first game to use the overtime rule, a game seen by 45 million persons.

During the 1959 season, the team posted a 9–3 record and once again defeated the Giants in the NFL Championship Game to claim their second title.

==== Don Shula years (1963–1969) ====
The Colts did not return to the NFL Championship for four seasons. In 1963, head coach Ewbank was replaced with the young Don Shula . In Shula's second season, the Colts compiled a 12–2 record, but lost to the Cleveland Browns in the NFL Championship 27–0.

===== NFL champions (1968) =====
In 1968, the Colts, under Unitas and Shula, won their third NFL Championship but lost in Super Bowl III.

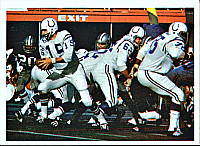
The Colts against Dallas in their first Super Bowl championship (V).

After the Colts trounced the Cleveland Browns 34–0 in the NFL Championship, many judged them among the "greatest pro football teams of all time" In Super Bowl III, they were favored by 18 points against the New York Jets, their counterparts from the American Football League. Instead, the Colts were stunned by the Jets, led by Joe Namath and Matt Snell under head coach Weeb Ewbank, who had previously won two NFL Championships with the Colts. Many in the sports media were surprised by the Jets' 16–7 victory, in the first Super Bowl win for the young AFL.

==== Don McCafferty years (1970–1972) ====
Rosenbloom of the Colts, Art Modell of the Browns, and Art Rooney of the Pittsburgh Steelers agreed to have their teams join the ten AFL teams in the American Football Conference as part of the AFL–NFL merger in 1970.

===== Super Bowl V champions (1970) =====
The Colts immediately went on a rampage in the new league, as new head coach Don McCafferty led the 1970 team to an 11–2–1 regular-season record, winning the AFC East title. In the first round of the NFL Playoffs, the Colts beat the Cincinnati Bengals 17–0; one week later in the first-ever AFC Championship Game, they beat the Oakland Raiders 27–17. Baltimore went on to win the first post-merger Super Bowl (Super Bowl V), defeating the National Football Conference's Dallas Cowboys 16–13 on a Jim O'Brien field goal with five seconds left to play. The victory gave the Colts their fourth NFL championship and first Super Bowl victory. After the championship, the Colts returned to the playoffs in 1971 and defeated the Cleveland Browns in the first round, but lost to the Miami Dolphins in the AFC Championship.

=== Robert Irsay era (1971–1996) ===
Citing friction with the City of Baltimore and the local press, Rosenbloom traded the Colts franchise to Robert Irsay on July 13, 1972, and received the Los Angeles Rams in return. Under the new ownership, the Colts did not reach the postseason for three consecutive seasons after 1971, and after the 1972 season, starting quarterback and legend Johnny Unitas was traded to the San Diego Chargers. After Unitas left, the Colts made the playoffs three consecutive seasons from 1975 to 1977, losing in the divisional round each time. The Colts' 1977 playoff loss in double overtime against the Oakland Raiders was the last playoff game for the team in Baltimore; it is known for the Ghost to the Post play. These consecutive championship teams featured 1976 NFL Most Valuable Player Bert Jones at quarterback and an outstanding defensive line, nicknamed the "Sack Pack".

The team endured nine consecutive losing seasons beginning in 1978. In 1981, the Colts defense allowed an NFL-record 533 points, set an all-time record for fewest sacks (13), and also set a modern record for fewest punt returns (12). The following year, the offense collapsed, including a game against the Buffalo Bills where the Colts' offense did not cross mid-field the entire game. The Colts finished 0–8–1 in the strike-shortened 1982 season, thereby earning the right to select Stanford quarterback John Elway with the first overall pick. Elway, however, refused to play for Baltimore, and using leverage as a draftee of the New York Yankees baseball club, forced a trade to Denver. Behind an improved defense the team finished 7–9 in 1983, their last season in Baltimore.

=== Move to Indianapolis ===
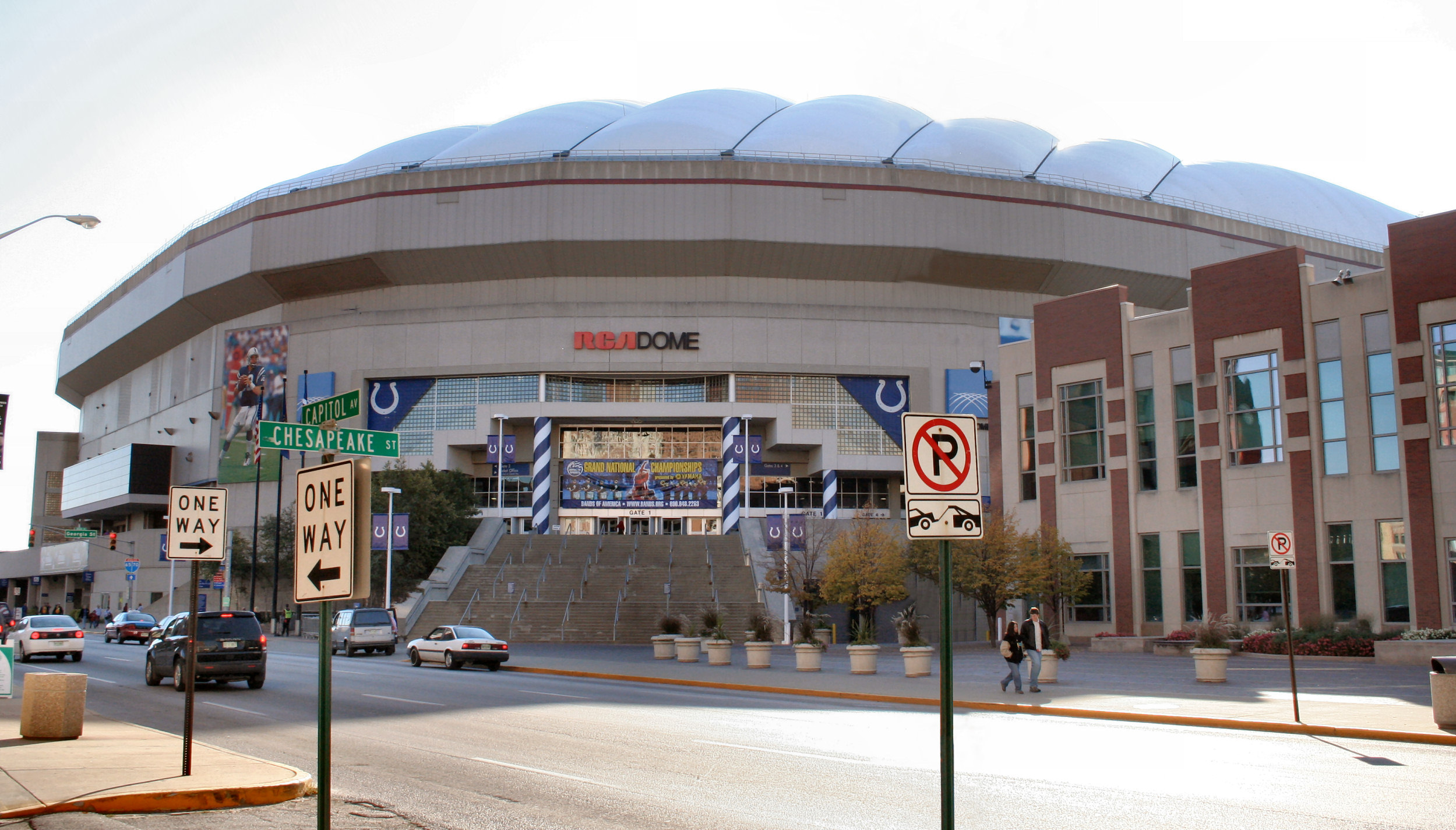
The Indianapolis Colts played in the RCA Dome from 1984 until 2007.

The Baltimore Colts played their final home game in Baltimore on December 18, 1983, against the Houston Oilers. Irsay continued to request upgrades to Memorial Stadium or construction of a new stadium. As a result of the poor performance on the field and the stadium issues, fan attendance and team revenue continued to dwindle. City officials were precluded from using tax-payer funds for the building of a new stadium, and the modest proposals that were offered by the city were not acceptable to either the Colts or the city's MLB franchise, the Orioles. However, all sides continued to negotiate. Relations between Irsay and the city of Baltimore deteriorated. Although Irsay assured fans that his ultimate desire was to stay in Baltimore, he nevertheless began discussions with several other cities willing to build new football stadiums, eventually narrowing the list of cities to Indianapolis and Phoenix. Under the administration of mayors Richard Lugar and then William Hudnut, Indianapolis had undertaken an ambitious effort to reinvent itself into a 'Great American City'. The Hoosier Dome, which was later renamed the RCA Dome, had been built specifically for, and was ready to host, an NFL expansion team.

Meanwhile, in Baltimore, the situation worsened. The Maryland General Assembly intervened when a bill was introduced to give the city of Baltimore the right to seize ownership of the team by eminent domain. As a result, Irsay began serious negotiations with Hudnut to move the team before the Maryland legislature could pass the law. Indianapolis offered loans as well as the Hoosier Dome and a training complex. After the deal was reached, moving vans from Indianapolis-based Mayflower Transit were dispatched overnight to the team's Maryland training complex, arriving on the morning of March 29, 1984. Once in Maryland, workers loaded all of the team's belongings, and by midday the trucks departed for Indianapolis, leaving nothing of the Colts organization that could be seized by Baltimore. The Baltimore Colts' Marching Band had to scramble to retrieve their equipment and uniforms before they were shipped to Indianapolis as well.

The move triggered a flurry of legal activity that ended when representatives of the city of Baltimore and the Colts organization reached a settlement in March 1986. Under the agreement, all lawsuits regarding the move were dismissed, and the Colts agreed to endorse a new NFL team for Baltimore.

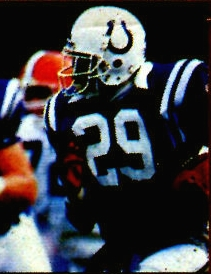
Eric Dickerson led the team in rushing and earned three Pro Bowl invitations during his tenure with the Colts (1987–1991).

Upon the Colts' arrival in Indianapolis over 143,000 requests for season tickets were received in just two weeks. The Colts did not change their name despite Indianapolis' lack of history of horse breeding and racing. The move did not change the recent fortune of the Colts, with the team appearing in the postseason only once in the first 11 seasons in Indianapolis. During the 1984 season, the first in Indianapolis, the team went 4–12 and accounted for the lowest offensive yardage in the league. The 1985 and 1986 teams combined for only eight wins, including an 0–13 start in 1986 which prompted the firing of head coach Rod Dowhower, who was replaced by Ron Meyer. The Colts, however, did receive eventual Hall of Fame running back Eric Dickerson as a result of a trade during the 1987 season, and went on to compile a 9–6 record, thereby winning the AFC East and advancing to the postseason for the first time in Indianapolis; they lost that game to the Cleveland Browns.

After 1987, the Colts did not see any real success for quite some time, with the team missing the postseason for seven consecutive seasons. The struggles came to a climax in 1991 when the team went 1–15 and was just one point away from the first all-losing season in the history of a 16-game schedule. The season resulted in the firing of head coach Ron Meyer and the return of former head coach Ted Marchibroda to the organization in 1992; he had coached the team from 1975 to 1979. The team continued to struggle under Marchibroda and Jim Irsay, son of Robert Irsay and general manager at the time. It was in 1994 that Robert Irsay brought in Bill Tobin to become the general manager of the Indianapolis Colts.

Under Tobin, the Colts drafted running back Marshall Faulk with the second overall pick in the 1994 NFL draft and acquired quarterback Jim Harbaugh as well. These Colts began to turn their fortunes around with playoff appearances in 1995 and 1996. The Colts won their first postseason game as the Indianapolis Colts in 1995 and advanced to the AFC Championship Game against the Pittsburgh Steelers, coming just a Hail Mary pass reception away from a trip to Super Bowl XXX.

Marchibroda retired after the 1995 season and was replaced by Lindy Infante in 1996. In the 1996 season, the Colts went 9–7 and had their season end in the Wild Card Round with a 42–14 loss to the PIttsburgh Steelers. After two consecutive playoff appearances, the Colts regressed and went 3–13 during the 1997 season.

=== Jim Irsay era (1997–2025) ===
Along with the disappointing season, the principal owner and man who moved the team to Indianapolis, Robert Irsay, died in January 1997 after years of declining health. Jim Irsay, Robert Irsay's son, entered the role of principal owner after his father's death and quickly began to change the organization. Irsay replaced general manager Tobin with Bill Polian in 1997 as the team decided to build through their number one overall pick in the 1998 draft.

==== Jim Mora years (1998–2001) ====
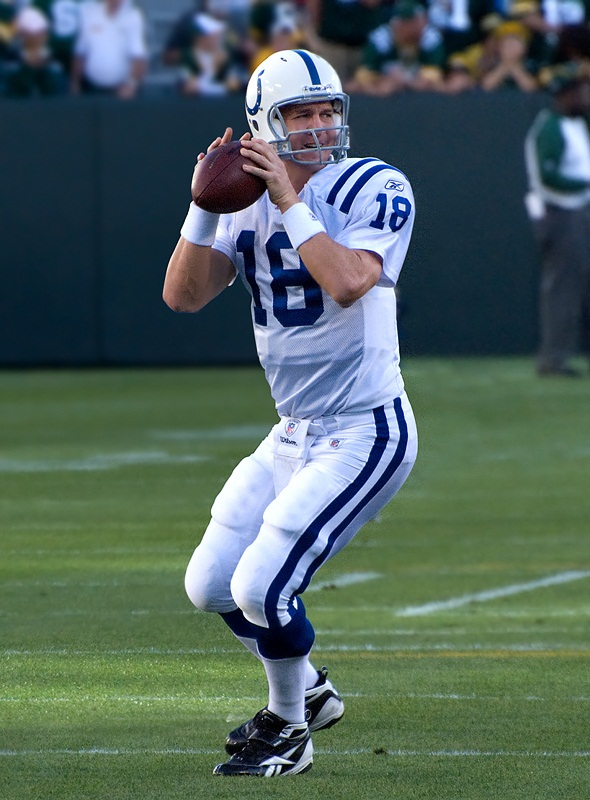
Peyton Manning was the starting quarterback for the Colts from 1998 until 2010.

Jim Irsay began to shape the Colts one year after assuming control from his father by firing head coach Lindy Infante and hiring Bill Polian as the general manager of the organization. Polian in turn hired Jim E. Mora to become the next head coach of the team and drafted Tennessee Volunteer quarterback Peyton Manning, the son of New Orleans Saints legend Archie Manning, with the first overall pick in the 1998 NFL draft.

The team and Manning struggled during the 1998 season, winning only three games; Manning threw a league high 28 interceptions. However, Manning did pass for 3,739 yards and threw 26 touchdown passes and was named to the NFL All-Rookie First Team. The Colts began to improve towards the end of the 1998 season and showed continued growth in 1999. Indianapolis drafted Edgerrin James in 1999 and continued to improve their roster heading into the upcoming season. The Colts went 13–3 in 1999 and finished first in the AFC East, their first division title since 1987. Indianapolis lost to the eventual AFC champion Tennessee Titans in the divisional playoffs.

The 2000 and 2001 Colts teams were considerably less successful compared to the 1999 team. The 2000 team went 10–6 and had their season end in the Wild Card Round with an overtime loss to the Miami Dolphins. Pressure began to mount on team administration and the coaching staff after a 6–10 season in 2001.

==== Tony Dungy years (2002–2008) ====
Mora was fired at the end of the season and was replaced by former Tampa Bay Buccaneers head coach Tony Dungy. Dungy and the team quickly changed the atmosphere of the organization and returned to the playoffs in 2002 with a 10–6 record, only for them to get shut out in the 2002 Wild Card Round to the New York Jets. The Colts also returned to the playoffs in 2003 and 2004 with 12–4 records and AFC South championships. The Colts lost to the New England Patriots and Tom Brady in the 2003 AFC Championship Game and in the 2004 divisional playoffs, thereby beginning a rivalry between the two teams, and between Manning and Brady. After two consecutive playoff losses to the Patriots, the Colts began the 2005 season with a 13–0 record, including a regular season victory over the Patriots, the first in the Manning era. During the season, Manning and Marvin Harrison broke the NFL record for touchdowns by a quarterback and receiver tandem. Indianapolis finished the 2005 season with a 14–2 record, the best record in the league that year and the best in a 16 games season for the franchise, but lost to the Pittsburgh Steelers in the divisional round.

===== Super Bowl XLI champions (2006) =====
Indianapolis entered the 2006 season with a veteran quarterback, receivers, and defenders, and chose running back Joseph Addai in the 2006 draft. As in the previous season, the Colts began the season undefeated and went 9–0 before losing their first game against the Dallas Cowboys. Indianapolis finished the season with a 12–4 record and entered the playoffs for the fifth consecutive year, this time as the number three seed in the AFC. The Colts won their first two playoff games against the Kansas City Chiefs and the Baltimore Ravens to return to the AFC Championship Game for the first time since the 2003 playoffs, where they faced their rivals, the New England Patriots. In a classic game, the Colts overcame a 21–3 first-half deficit to win the game 38–34 and earned a trip to Super Bowl XLI, the franchise's first Super Bowl appearance since 1970 and for the first based in Indianapolis. The Colts faced the Chicago Bears in the Super Bowl, winning the game 29–17 and giving Manning, Polian, Irsay, and Dungy, as well as the city of Indianapolis, their first Super Bowl title.

The Colts compiled a 13–3 record during the 2007 season; they lost to the San Diego Chargers in the divisional playoffs, in what was the final game the Colts played at the RCA Dome before moving into Lucas Oil Stadium in 2008. The 2008 season began with Manning being sidelined for most of the pre-season due to surgery. Indianapolis began the season with a 3–4 record, but then won nine consecutive games to end the season at 12–4 and make in into the playoffs as a wild card team, eventually losing to the Chargers in the wild card round. After the season, Tony Dungy announced his retirement after seven seasons as head coach, having compiled an overall record of 92–33 with the team.

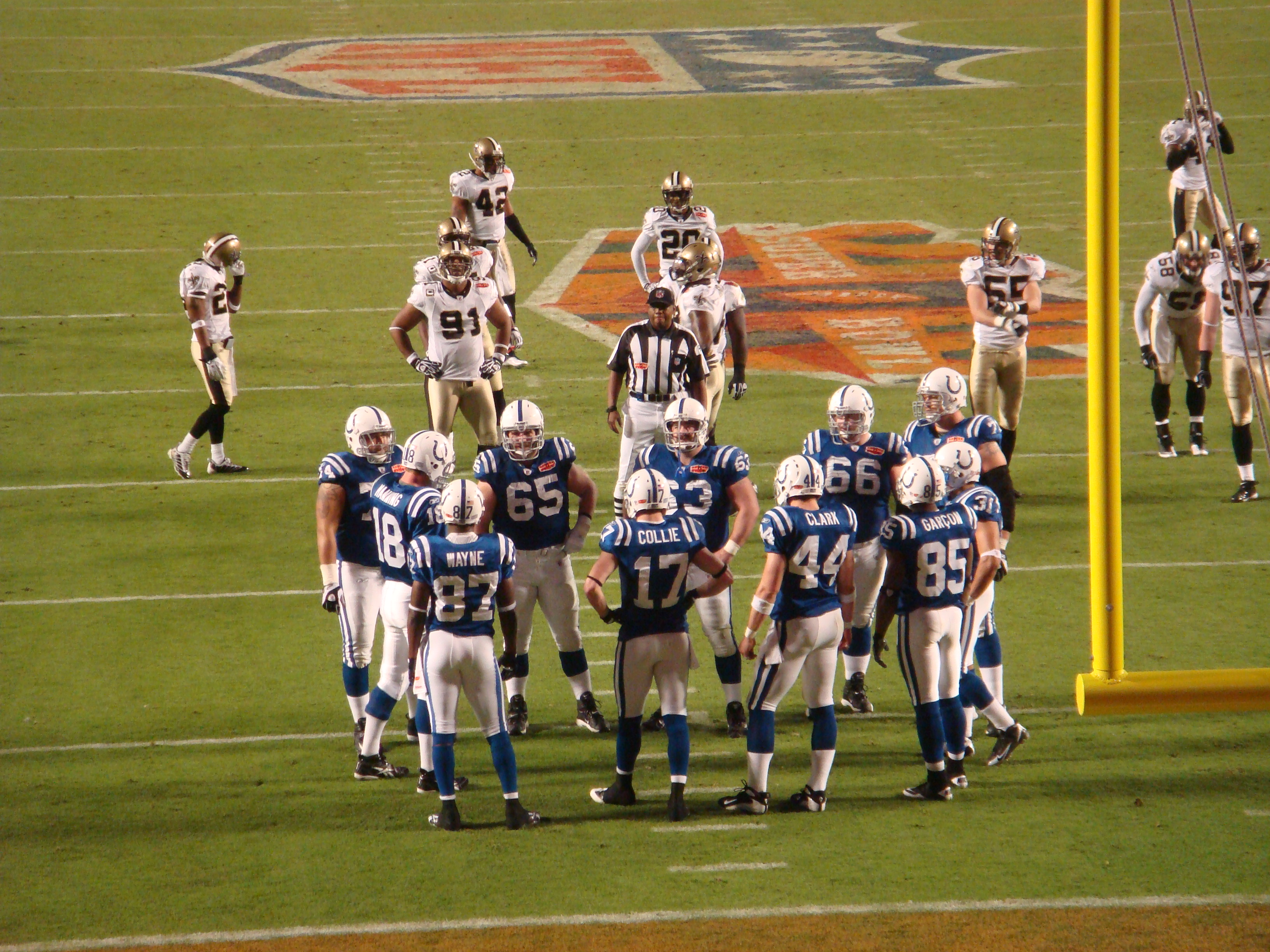
Indianapolis offensive line huddles during Super Bowl XLIV (2010)

==== Jim Caldwell years (2009–2011) ====
Jim Caldwell was hired as head coach of the team after Dungy, and led the team during the 2009 season. The Colts went 14–0 during the season to finish with a record of 14–2 after controversially benching their starters during the last two games. The Colts for the second time in the Manning era entered the playoffs with the best record in the AFC. The Colts managed victories over the Baltimore Ravens and New York Jets to advance to Super Bowl XLIV against the New Orleans Saints, but lost to the Saints 31–17.

At the completion of the 2009 season, the Colts had finished the first decade of the 2000s (2000–2009) with the most regular-season wins (115) and highest winning percentage (.719) of any team in the NFL during that span.

The 2010 team compiled a 10–6 record, the first time the Colts did not win 12 games since 2002, and lost to the New York Jets in the wild card round of the playoffs. The loss to the Jets was the last game for Peyton Manning as a Colt.

After missing the preseason, Manning was ruled out for the Colts' opening game in Houston and eventually the entire 2011 season. Taking over as starter was veteran quarterback Kerry Collins, who had been signed to the team after dissatisfaction with backup quarterback Curtis Painter and Dan Orlovsky. However, even with a veteran quarterback, the Colts lost their first 13 games and finished the season with a 2–14 record, enough to receive the first overall pick in the 2012 draft. Immediately after the season, team president Bill Polian was fired, ending his 14-year tenure with the team. The change built the anticipation of the organization's decision regarding Manning's future with the team. The Peyton Manning era came to an end on March 8, 2012, when Jim Irsay announced that Manning was being released from the roster after 13 seasons.

==== Chuck Pagano years (2012–2017) ====
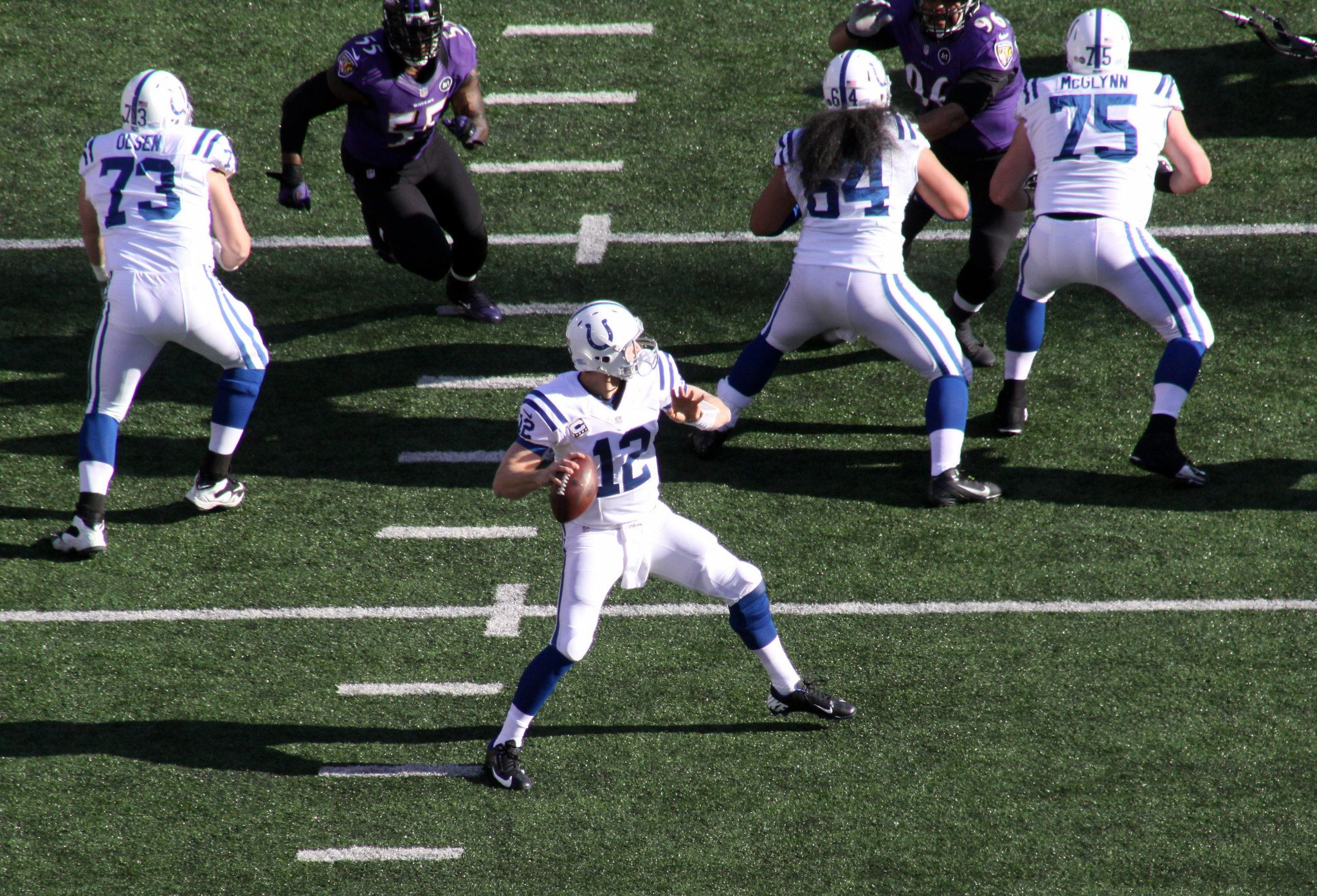
Luck during his first playoff game against the Baltimore Ravens

During the 2012 off-season owner Jim Irsay hired Ryan Grigson to be the general manager. Grigson decided to let head coach Jim Caldwell go and Chuck Pagano was hired as the new head coach shortly thereafter. The Colts also began to release some higher paid and oft-injured veteran players, including Joseph Addai, Dallas Clark, and Gary Brackett. The Colts used their number one overall draft pick in 2012 to draft Stanford Cardinal quarterback Andrew Luck and also drafted his teammate Coby Fleener in the second round. The team also switched to a 3–4 defensive scheme.

With productive seasons from both Luck and veteran receiver Reggie Wayne, the Colts rebounded from the 2–14 season of 2011 with a 2012 season record of 11–5. The franchise, team, and fan base rallied behind head coach Chuck Pagano during his fight with leukemia. Clinching an unexpected playoff spot in the 2012–13 NFL playoffs, the 14th playoff berth for the club since 1995. The season ended in a 24–9 playoff loss to the eventual Super Bowl Champion Baltimore Ravens.

Two weeks into the 2013 season, the Colts traded their first-round selection in the 2014 NFL draft to the Cleveland Browns for running back Trent Richardson. In Week 7, Luck led the Colts to a 39–33 win over his predecessor, Peyton Manning, and the undefeated Broncos. Luck went on to lead the Colts to a 15th division championship later that season. In the first round of the 2013 NFL playoffs, Andrew Luck led the Colts to a 45–44 victory over Kansas City, outscoring the Chiefs 35–13 in the second half in the second biggest comeback in NFL playoff history.

During the 2014 season, Luck led the Colts to the AFC Championship game for the first time in his career after breaking the Colts' single-season passing yardage record previously held by Manning.

After the Colts finished 8–8 in both the 2015 and 2016 seasons and missed the playoffs in back-to-back seasons for the first time since 1997–98, Grigson was fired as general manager. Just three of his previous 18 draft picks remained on the team at the time of his firing. On January 30, 2017, the team hired Chris Ballard, who served as the Kansas City Chiefs director of football operations, to replace Grigson.

On December 31, 2017, after winning the final game of the season and a final record of 4–12, the Colts parted ways with Pagano. Luck, who had suffered multiple injuries and missed nine games during the 2015 season, sat out the entire 2017 season recovering from shoulder surgery.

In the weeks following the end of the 2017 season, after two interviews, it was widely reported that the Colts would hire Josh McDaniels, offensive coordinator of the New England Patriots, to replace Pagano, after McDaniels fulfilled his obligations to the Patriots in Super Bowl LII. On February 8, 2018, the Colts announced McDaniels as their new head coach. Hours later, however, McDaniels rescinded his decision to be the head coach, and he returned to the Patriots.

==== Frank Reich years (2018–2022) ====
On February 11, 2018, the Colts announced Frank Reich, then offensive coordinator of the Philadelphia Eagles, as their new head coach. In Reich's first season as head coach, Andrew Luck's return to the field got off to a shaky start, as the Colts began the 2018 season 1–5. However, they surged back to win nine of their last ten games to secure a 10–6 record and a playoff berth. They won a wild card game against their division rival Houston Texans before falling to the Kansas City Chiefs in the divisional round. Luck, benefiting from the Colts' best offensive line of his career, was named the 2018 Comeback Player of the Year.

Colts General Manager Chris Ballard achieved a historic feat in 2018 when two players he had drafted that year, guard Quenton Nelson and linebacker Shaquille Leonard were both named First-Team All-Pro. This was the first time two rookies from the same team received that honor since Hall-of-Famers Dick Butkus and Gale Sayers achieved the feat in 1965.

On August 24, 2019, Luck informed the Colts that he would be retiring from the NFL after not attending training camp. He cited an unfulfilling cycle of injury and rehab as his primary reason for leaving football.

On November 17, 2019, the Colts defeated the Jacksonville Jaguars for the team's 300th win in the Indianapolis era, with a record of 300–267. Despite a promising 5–2 start and strong seasons from Leonard, Nelson, and newly acquired defensive end Justin Houston, the Colts struggled in the second half of the 2019 season with new starting quarterback Jacoby Brissett at the helm and finished the year with a 7–9 record.

On March 17, 2020, the Colts signed longtime Los Angeles Chargers quarterback and eight-time Pro Bowler Philip Rivers to a one-year deal worth $25 million. Rivers led the Colts to an 11–5 record and a playoff berth, where they then lost to the Buffalo Bills in the Wild Card Round of the NFL's first expanded playoffs.

On March 17, 2021, the Colts traded a 2021 third-round pick and a 2022 second-round conditional pick for former Eagles quarterback Carson Wentz. Despite an All-Pro season from running back Jonathan Taylor, the Colts finished the season 9–8 after an upset loss to the Jacksonville Jaguars that eliminated the Colts from playoff contention. The Colts then traded Wentz and a second-round pick to the Washington Commanders in exchange for three draft picks.

On March 21, 2022, the Colts traded a 2022 third-round pick for longtime Atlanta Falcons quarterback Matt Ryan. After playing seven games in which he threw for nine touchdowns and nine interceptions, while also fumbling 11 times, Ryan was benched for the remainder of the season in favor of Sam Ehlinger.

On November 7, 2022, the Colts fired Reich as head coach the day after losing by 23 points to the New England Patriots to continue a disappointing 3–5–1 start. Longtime Colts center Jeff Saturday was subsequently named the interim head coach. Under Saturday, the Colts went 1–7, and overall, the Colts finished the 2022 season with a record of 4–12–1, their lowest win total since 2017.

==== Shane Steichen years (2023–present) ====
Coming off their lowest win total since 2017, the Colts decided not to retain interim head coach Jeff Saturday and on February 14, 2023, they hired Shane Steichen as their new head coach. Later in the offseason, the Colts released quarterbacks Matt Ryan and Nick Foles. The Colts would go on to select Florida Gators quarterback Anthony Richardson with the fourth pick in the 2023 NFL draft. In free agency, the Colts signed quarterback Gardner Minshew and kicker Matt Gay.

On October 18, 2023, the Colts announced that Richardson would miss the remainder of the season with a Grade 3 AC joint sprain. On October 24, 2023, he successfully underwent shoulder surgery to repair the sprain. Backup quarterback Minshew was named by Steichen as the starter during Richardson's absence. During the 2023 NFL season, wide receiver Michael Pittman Jr. broke the Colts franchise record for the most receptions in the first four years of a player's career. Despite many injuries, including to Richardson and All-Pro running back Jonathan Taylor, the 2023 Colts rebounded from their 4–12–1 record in 2022, finishing 9–8 and narrowly missing the playoffs with a loss to the Houston Texans in the season finale. In 2024, On April 25, 2024, the Colts selected UCLA defensive end Laiatu Latu with the 15th pick in the 2024 NFL draft. In 2024, the Colts failed to improve on their 9–8 record and were eliminated from the playoffs by a week 17 loss to the New York Giants, finishing 8–9.

=== Carlie Irsay-Gordon era (2025–present) ===
On May 21, 2025, Colts owner and CEO Jim Irsay died at the age of 65. On June 9, 2025, the team announced that Irsay's three daughters would inherit an equal ownership stake and would assume new roles within the organization. Irsay's oldest daughter, Carlie Irsay-Gordon, was named principal owner and CEO with middle daughter Casey Foyt named executive vice president and youngest daughter Kalen Jackson named chief brand officer and president of the Indianapolis Colts Foundation.

== Logos and uniforms ==
The Colts' former wordmark logo, used from 1984 to 2019.

The Colts' helmets in 1953 were white with a blue stripe. In 1954–55 they were blue with a white stripe and a pair of horseshoes at the rear of the helmet. For 1956, the colors were reversed, white helmet, blue stripe and horseshoes at the rear. In 1957, the horseshoes moved to their current location, one on each side of the helmet.

The blue jerseys have white shoulder stripes and the white jerseys have blue stripes. The team also wears white pants with blue stripes down the sides. Both designs originally had sleeve stripes, but by 1957, the uniforms changed to its current form, which evolved as materials changed.

For much of the team's history, the Colts wore blue socks, accenting them with two or three white stripes for much of their history in Baltimore and during the 2004 and 2005 seasons. From 1982 to 1987, the blue socks featured gray stripes. For a period lasting 1955 to 1958 and again from 1988 to 1992, the Colts wore white socks with either two or three blue stripes.

From 1982 through 1986, the Colts wore gray pants with their blue jerseys. The gray pants featured a horseshoe on the top of the sides with the player's number inside the horseshoe. The Colts continued to wear white pants with their white jerseys throughout this period, and in 1987, the gray pants were retired.

The Colts wore blue pants with their white jerseys for the first three games of the 1995 season (pairing them with white socks), but then returned to white pants with both the blue and white jerseys. The team made some minor uniform adjustments before the start of the 2004 season, including reverting from blue to the traditional gray face masks, darkening their blue colors from a royal blue to speed blue, as well as adding two white stripes to the socks. In 2006, the stripes were removed from the socks.

In 2002, the Colts made a minor striping pattern change on their jerseys, having the stripes only on top of the shoulders then stop completely. Previously, the stripes used to go around to underneath the jersey sleeves. This was done because the Colts, like many other football teams, were beginning to manufacture the jerseys to be tighter to reduce holding calls and reduce the size of the sleeves. Although the white jerseys of the Minnesota Vikings at the time also had a similar striping pattern and continued as such (as well as the throwbacks the New England Patriots wore in the Thanksgiving game against the Detroit Lions in 2002, though the Patriots later wore the same throwbacks in 2009 with truncated stripes and in 2010 became their official alternate uniform), the Colts and most college teams with this striping pattern did not make this adjustment.

In 2017, the Colts brought back the blue pants but paired them with the blue jerseys as part of the NFL Color Rush program.

The club revealed an updated wordmark logo, as well as updated numeral fonts, on April 13, 2020. While blue and white remained the team's core colors, they added black as a tertiary color, with its usage restricted to the embroidered Nike swoosh on the white uniforms. Despite the wordmark change, the previous wordmarks were still painted on the Lucas Oil Stadium end zones until 2024, when the Colts unveiled a new turf surface.

On July 20, 2023, the Colts unveiled a new alternate uniform, including a black alternate helmet. The jersey remained blue, but added black trim to the numbers and moved the white sleeve stripes to the shoulders. The "Indiana C" alternate logo was placed on the left shoulder. Blue pants with white stripes are paired with this uniform. In a first for the franchise, the Colts would wear black helmets with the uniform, maintaining almost the same look as the primary white helmet save for the increased usage of black.

On August 25, 2026, the Colts unveiled a "Rivalries" uniform which they would wear at home for three seasons against AFC South opponents. Nicknamed the "Anvil Strike", it featured an anthracite base inspired by steel anvils, a metallic blue helmet, blue numbers and striping trimmed in black and a silver horseshoe on the sleeves.

== Facilities ==
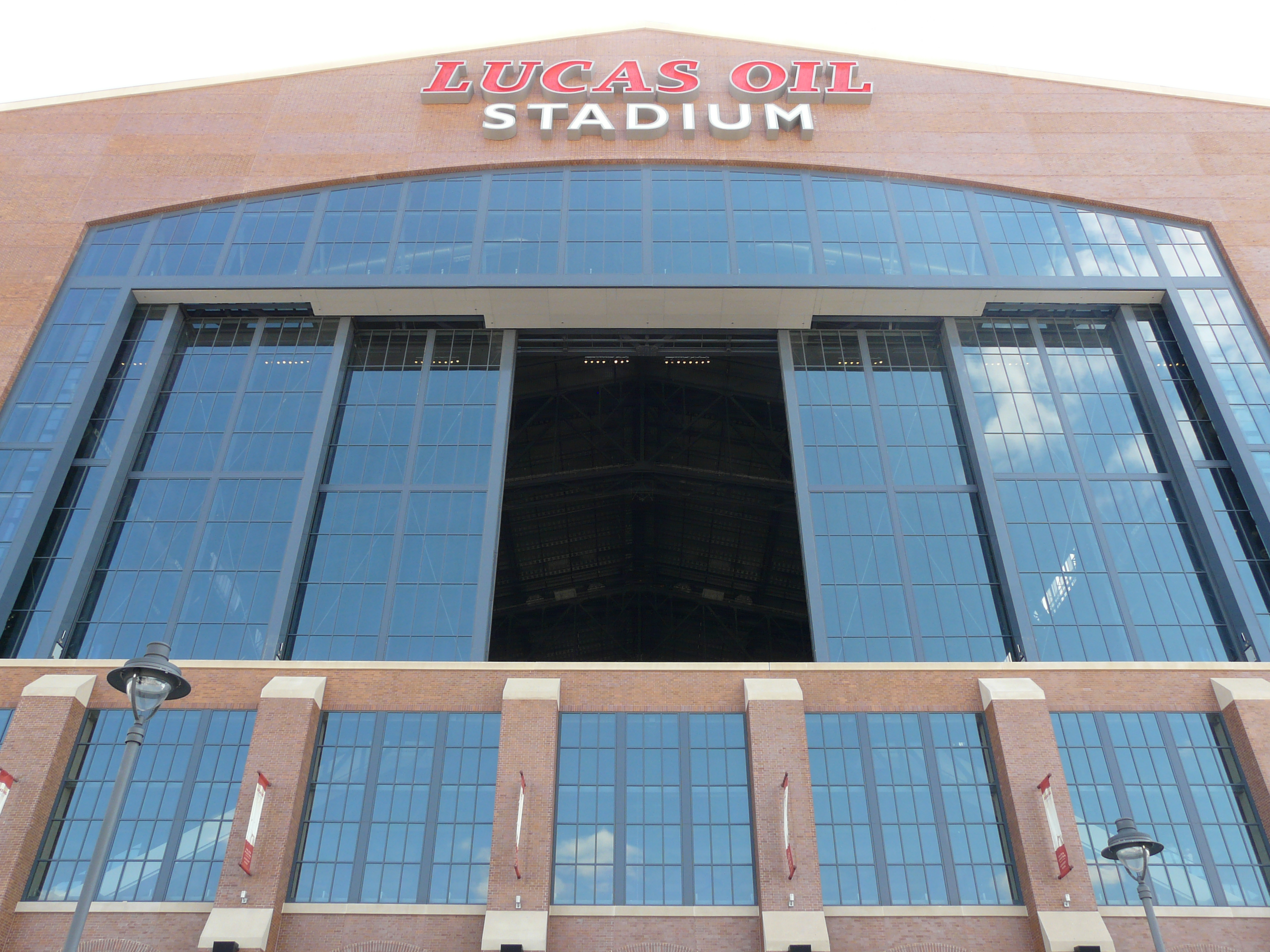
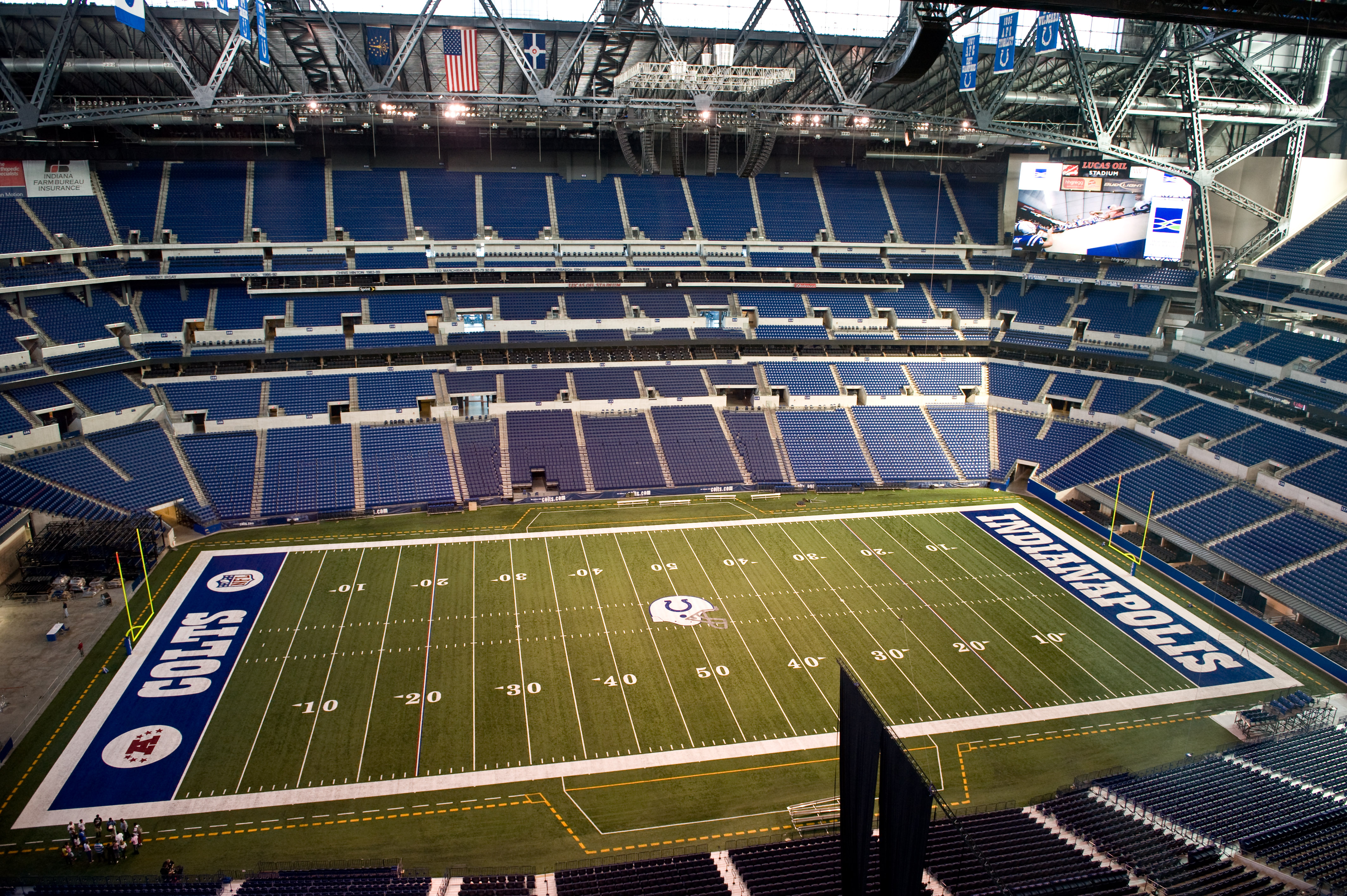
Lucas Oil Stadium, home of the Indianapolis Colts.

After 24 years of playing at the RCA Dome, the Colts moved to their new home Lucas Oil Stadium in the late 2008. In December 2004, the City of Indianapolis and Jim Irsay agreed to a new stadium deal at an estimated cost of $1 billion (including the Indiana Convention Center upgrades). In a deal estimated at $122 million, Lucas Oil Products won the naming rights to the stadium for 20 years.

Lucas Oil Stadium is a seven-level stadium that seats 63,000 for football. It can be reconfigured to seat 70,000 or more for NCAA basketball and football and concerts. It covers 1.8 million square feet (170,000 m^{2}). The stadium features a retractable roof allowing the Colts to play home games outdoors for the first time since arriving in Indianapolis. Using FieldTurf, the playing surface is roughly 25 ft (7.6 m) below ground level. In addition to being larger than the RCA Dome, the new stadium features: 58 permanent concession stands, 90 portable concession stands, 13 escalators, 11 passenger elevators, 800 restrooms, HD video displays from Daktronics and replay monitors and 142 luxury suites. The stadium also features a retractable roof, with electrification technology developed by VAHLE, Inc. Other than being the home of the Colts, the stadium will host games in both the Men's and Women's NCAA basketball tournaments and will serve as the backup host for all NCAA Final Four Tournaments. The stadium hosted the Super Bowl for the 2011 season (Super Bowl XLVI). Lucas Oil Stadium has also hosted the Drum Corps International World Championships since 2009.

== Rivalries ==
=== Divisional ===
==== Houston Texans ====
In one of the newer rivalries in the NFL, the Colts and Houston Texans have intensified their animosity in recent years. Despite Indianapolis dominating the AFC South and this particular series under quarterback Peyton Manning in the 2000s, Houston has recently provided more competition, winning the division five times since 2011. As of the 2023 season, Indianapolis currently leads the series 33–11–1, including a win in the postseason in 2018.

==== Jacksonville Jaguars ====
The Colts and Jacksonville Jaguars emerged as divisional rivals in the NFL when they were assigned to the AFC South division. Historically, the Colts have had the upper hand in this rivalry, particularly during the Peyton Manning era. Although the Jaguars have struggled to maintain a consistently competitive roster, they have managed to achieve significant upsets against the Colts and have recorded more victories against them than against the Titans and Texans. The 2020s have marked a period of increased competitiveness for both teams.

==== Tennessee Titans ====
The Colts and Titans, the oldest rivalry in the AFC South, have been competing against each other since the 1970 season, originally as the Baltimore Colts and the Houston Oilers. They became divisional rivals in the 2002 season, leading to numerous contests for the AFC South title, with the Titans occasionally managing to wrest the title from the Colts. In recent years, however, the Colts have largely controlled the rivalry, thanks in part to the exceptional performances of quarterbacks Peyton Manning and Andrew Luck, with Luck finishing his career undefeated against the Titans, going 11–0. Nonetheless, the 2020s have seen a resurgence in competitiveness from both teams as they vie for the AFC South title and a playoff berth.

As of the 2023 season, the Colts lead the overall series, 37–22. The two teams have met once in the playoffs, with the Titans winning 19–16 in the 2000 AFC Divisional playoff game.

=== Conference ===
==== Baltimore Ravens ====
After the Colts left for Indianapolis, Baltimore got a new NFL team called the Baltimore Ravens, and a rivalry somewhat developed much like the one between the Houston Texans and Tennessee Titans. The Colts and Ravens have met in the playoffs three times, with the Colts leading 2–1.

==== New England Patriots ====
The rivalry between the Indianapolis Colts and New England Patriots is one of the NFL's newest rivalries. The rivalry is fueled by the quarterback comparison between Peyton Manning and Tom Brady during the 2000s. The Patriots owned the beginning of the series, defeating the Colts in six consecutive contests including the 2003 AFC Championship game and a 2004 AFC Divisional game. The Colts won the next three matches, notching two regular-season victories and a win in the 2006 AFC Championship game on the way to their win in Super Bowl XLI. On November 4, 2007, the Patriots defeated the Colts 24–20; in the next matchup on November 2, 2008, the Colts won 18–15 in a game that was one of the reasons the Patriots failed to make the playoffs; in the 2009 meeting, the Colts staged a spirited comeback to beat the Patriots 35–34; in 2010 the Colts almost staged another comeback, pulling within 31–28 after trailing 31–14 in the fourth quarter, but fell short due to a Patriots interception of a Manning pass late in the game; it turned out to be Manning's final meeting against the Patriots as a member of the Colts. After a dismal 2011 season that included a 31–24 loss to the Patriots, the Colts drafted Andrew Luck and in November of 2012 the two teams met with identical 6–3 records; the Patriots erased a 14–7 gap to win 59–24. The nature of this rivalry is ironic because the Colts and Patriots were division rivals from 1970 to 2001, but it did not become prominent in league circles until after Indianapolis was moved to the AFC South. On November 16, 2014, the New England Patriots traveled at 7–2 to play the 6–3 Colts at Lucas Oil Stadium. After a stellar four-touchdown performance by New England running back Jonas Gray, the Patriots defeated the Colts 42–20. The Patriots followed with a 45–7 defeat of the Colts in the 2014 AFC Championship Game. As of the 2023 season, the Patriots lead the all-time series 53–31.

=== Historic ===
In the years 1953–66, the Colts played in the NFL Western Conference (also known as division), but did not have significant rivalries with other franchises in that alignment, as they were the easternmost team and the rest of the division included the Great Lakes franchises Green Bay, Detroit Lions, Chicago Bears, and after 1961, the Minnesota Vikings, along with the league's two West Coast teams in San Francisco and Los Angeles. The closest team to Baltimore was the Washington Redskins, but they were not in the same division and not very competitive during most years at that time.

==== New York Giants ====
In 1958, Baltimore played its first NFL Championship Game against the 10–3 New York Giants. The Giants qualified for the championship after a tie-breaking playoff against the Cleveland Browns. Having already been defeated by the Giants in the regular season, Baltimore was not favored to win, yet proceeded to take the title in sudden death overtime. The Colts then repeated the feat by posting an identical record and routing the Giants in the 1959 final. Up until the Colts' back-to-back titles, the Giants had been the premier club in the NFL, and continued to be post-season stalwarts the next decade, losing three straight finals. The situation was reversed by the end of the decade, with Baltimore winning the 1968 NFL title and New York compiling less impressive results. In recent years, the Colts and Giants featured brothers as their starting quarterbacks (Peyton and Eli Manning respectively), leading to their occasional match-up being referred to as the "Manning Bowl". As of the 2023 season, the Colts lead the all-time series 12–7.

==== New York Jets ====
Super Bowl III became the most famous upset in professional sports history as the American Football League's New York Jets won 16–7 over the overwhelmingly favored Colts. With the merger of the AFL and NFL the Colts and Jets were placed in the new AFC East. The two teams met twice a year (interrupted in 1982 by a player strike) 1970–2001; with the move of the Colts to the AFC South the two teams' rivalry actually escalated, as they met three times in the playoffs in the South's first nine seasons of existence; the Jets crushed the Colts 41–0 in the 2002 Wild Card playoff round; the Colts then defeated the Jets 30–17 in the 2009 AFC Championship Game; but the next year in the wild-card round the Jets pulled off another playoff upset of the Colts, winning 17–16; it was Peyton Manning's final game with the Colts. The Jets defeated the Colts 35–9 in 2012 in Andrew Luck's debut season; after two straight losses Luck led a 45–10 rout of the Jets in 2016.

Joe Namath and Johnny Unitas were the focal point of the rivalry at its beginning, but they did not meet for a full game until September 24, 1972. Namath erupted with six touchdowns and 496 passing yards despite only 28 throws and 15 completions. Unitas threw for 376 yards and two scores but was sacked six times as the Jets won 44–34; the game was considered one of the top ten passing duels in NFL history. As of the 2023 season, the Colts lead the all-time series 44–32.

== Players of note ==
=== Current roster ===
Indianapolis Colts roster
Quarterbacks (QB): 17 Daniel Jones; 15 Riley Leonard; 5 Anthony Richardson; Running backs (RB): 21 DJ Giddens; 20 Seth McGowan; 28 Jonathan Taylor; Wide receivers (WR): 80 Deion Burks; 16 Ashton Dulin KR; 6 Anthony Gould; 13 Laquon Treadwell; 9 Quez Watkins; 12 Nick Westbrook-Ikhine; Tight ends (TE): 49 Pharaoh Brown; 86 Will Mallory; 85 Drew Ogletree; 84 Tyler Warren	Offensive linemen (OL): 60 Tanor Bortolini C; 62 Jalen Farmer G; 71 Matt Goncalves G; 73 Charlie Heck T; 79 Bernhard Raimann T; 67 Luke Tenuta T; 75 Jalen Travis T; 68 Dalton Tucker G; 63 Sedrick Van Pran-Granger C; Defensive linemen (DL): 95 Adetomiwa Adebawore DT; 55 Caden Curry DE; 74 Kevin Givens DT; 52 George Gumbs Jr. DE; 98 Arden Key DE; 97 Laiatu Latu DE; 93 Tim Smith DT; 90 Grover Stewart DT; 94 Jerry Tillery DT; 91 JT Tuimoloau DE	Linebackers (LB): 58 Austin Ajiake; 53 CJ Allen; 50 Bryce Boettcher; 44 Tahj Chambers; 47 West Weeks; Defensive backs (DB): 0 Camryn Bynum S; 35 Johnathan Edwards CB; 1 Sauce Gardner CB; 34 Kapena Gushiken CB; 33 Kenneth Harris CB; 25 A. J. Haulcy S; 38 Jonathan Owens S; 27 Justin Walley CB; 7 Charvarius Ward CB; 30 Hunter Wohler S; Special teams (ST): 46 Luke Rhodes LS; 8 Rigoberto Sanchez P; 3 Spencer Shrader K	Practice squad: 92 Cameron Ball DT; 39 Shemar Bartholomew CB; 48 Jacob Bobenmoyer LS; 36 Davon Booth RB; 40 Natrone Brooks CB; 83 Harrison Bryant TE; 66 Joshua Gray G; 11 Mecole Hardman WR; 65 Reid Holskey T; 96 Carl Lawson DE; 78 Roy Mbaeteka T (IPP); 54 Mitchell Melton DE; 76 Nolan Rucci T; 32 Daniel Scott S; 10 Samori Toure WR; 41 Trey Washington S; Reserve: 81 Mo Alie-Cox TE (IR); 57 Jaylon Carlies LB (IR); 72 Micheal Clemons DE (IR); 51 Akeem Davis-Gaither LB (IR); 43 Cameron Mitchell CB (IR); 2 D. J. Montgomery WR (IR); 14 Alec Pierce WR (IR); 29 Cam Taylor-Britt CB (IR); 45 Carson Towt TE (IR) 53 active, 15 practice squad (1 IPP), 9 reserve As of November 17, 2026. Rookies in italics.; Roster; Depth chart; Transactions

=== Retired numbers ===
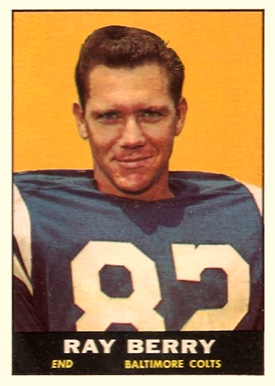
Hall of Fame WR Raymond Berry

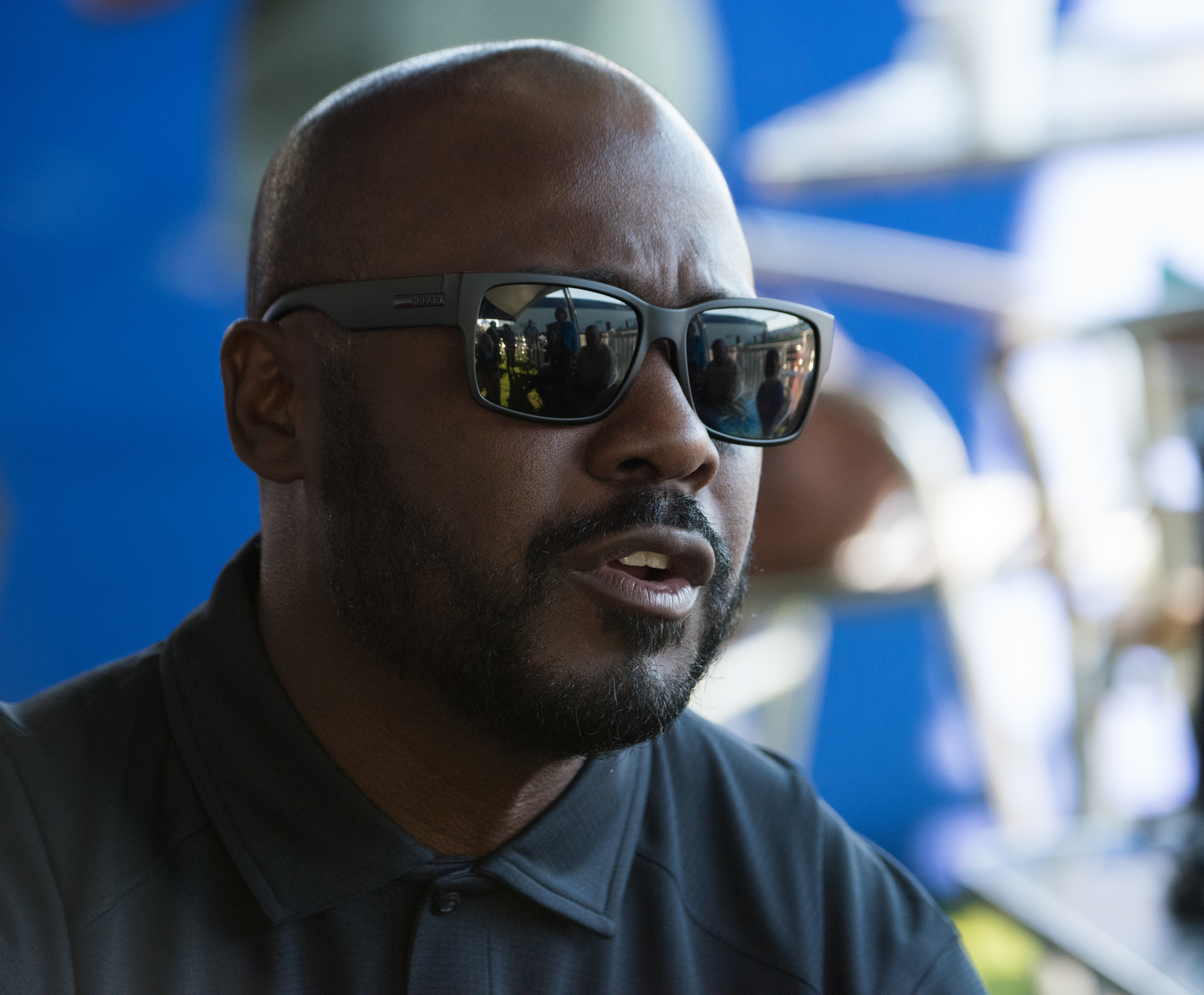
Hall of Fame RB Marshall Faulk

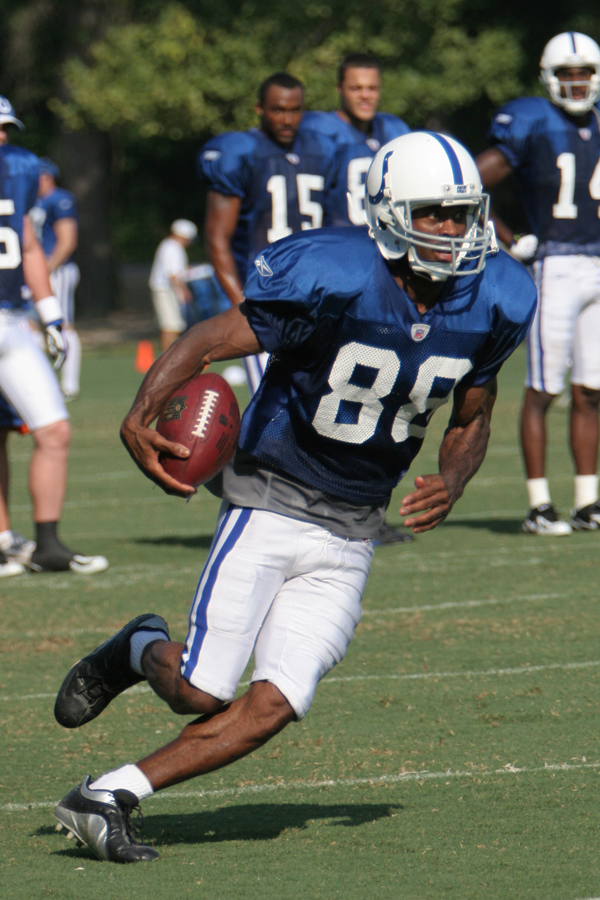
Hall of Fame WR Marvin Harrison

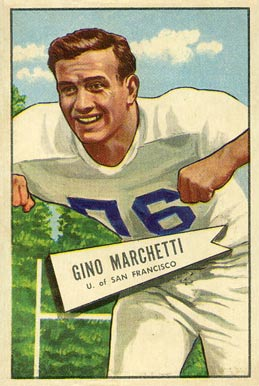
Hall of Fame DE Gino Marchetti

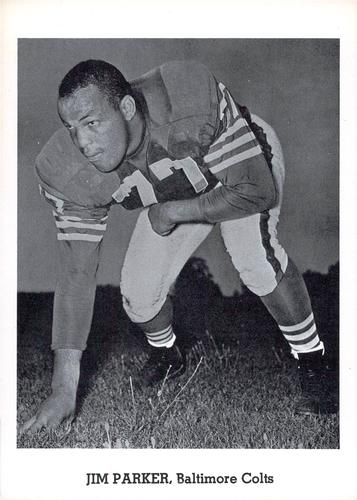
Hall of Fame OL Jim Parker

Retired numbers for the Indianapolis Colts
No.	Player	Position	Years played	Retired
18	Peyton Manning	QB	1998–2011	October 8, 2017
19	Johnny Unitas	QB	1956–1972	
22	Buddy Young	RB	1953–1955	
24	Lenny Moore	HB	1956–1967	November 24, 1968
70	Art Donovan	DT	1953–1961	1962
77	Jim Parker	OL	1957–1967	
82	Raymond Berry	WR	1955–1967	
89	Gino Marchetti	DE	1953–1966	

=== Pro Football Hall of Famers ===
Baltimore/Indianapolis Colts players in the Pro Football Hall of Fame
No.	Name	Positions	Seasons	Inducted
82	Raymond Berry	SE	1955–1967	1973
96	Richard Dent	DE	1996	2011
29	Eric Dickerson	RB	1987–1991	1999
70	Art Donovan	DT	1953–1961	1968
28	Marshall Faulk	RB	1994–1998	2011
93	Dwight Freeney	DE	2002–2012	2024
88	Marvin Harrison	WR	1996–2008	2016
83	Ted Hendricks	LB	1969–1973	1990
32	Edgerrin James	RB	1999–2005	2020
81	Andre Johnson	WR	2015	2024
88	John Mackey	TE	1963–1971	1992
89	Gino Marchetti	DE	1953–1964; 1966	1972
18	Peyton Manning	QB	1998–2011	2021
77	Jim Parker	OT	1957–1967	1973
24	Lenny Moore	HB	1956–1967	1975
34	Joe Perry	FB	1961–1962	1969
19	Johnny Unitas	QB	1956–1972	1979
4	Adam Vinatieri	K	2006–2019	2026

Baltimore/Indianapolis Colts coaches and executives in the Pro Football Hall of Fame
Name	Positions	Tenure	Inducted
Weeb Ewbank	Head coach	1954–1962	1978
Don Shula	Head coach	1963–1969	1997
Bill Polian	President/GM	1998–2011	2015
Tony Dungy	Head coach	2002–2008	2016

=== Ring of Honor ===
The Ring of Honor was established on September 23, 1996. There have been 20 inductees (21st to be inducted in October 2026), with all inductees being players who exclusively played in Indianapolis or were an executive in Baltimore.

Indianapolis Colts Ring of Honor
No.	Name	Position	Years With Club	Inducted
—	Robert Irsay	Owner	1972–1997	1996
80	Bill Brooks	WR	1986–1992	1998
75	Chris Hinton	OT, OG	1983–1989	2001
—	Ted Marchibroda	Head coach	1975–1979; 1992–1995	2002
4	Jim Harbaugh	QB	1994–1997	2005
—	12th Man	Fans	—	2007
—	Tony Dungy	Head coach	2002–2008	2010
88	Marvin Harrison	WR	1996–2008	2011
32	Edgerrin James	RB	1999–2005	2012
29	Eric Dickerson	RB	1987–1991	2013
28	Marshall Faulk	RB	1994–1998	2013
6	Jeff Saturday	C	1999–2011	2015
—	Bill Polian	President/General Manager	1998–2011	2017
18	Peyton Manning	QB	1998–2011	2017
87	Reggie Wayne	WR	2001–2014	2018
93	Dwight Freeney	DE	2002–2012	2019
98	Robert Mathis	DE	2003–2016	2021
78	Tarik Glenn	OT	1997–2006	2022
44	Dallas Clark	TE	2003–2011	2024
—	Jim Irsay	General Manager/Owner	1984–2025	2025
4	Adam Vinatieri	K	2006–2019	2026

== Staff and head coaches ==
=== Current staff ===
Indianapolis Colts staff
Front office: Owner/CEO – Carlie Irsay-Gordon; Owner/executive vice president – Casey Foyt; Owner/chief brand officer – Kalen Jackson; General manager – Vacant; Assistant general manager – Ed Dodds; Director of player personnel – Kevin Rogers Jr.; Director of football administration – Mike Bluem; Director of pro scouting – Jon Shaw; Assistant director of pro scouting – Joey Elliott; Director of college scouting – Matt Terpening; Assistant director of college scouting – Jamie Moore; Senior player personnel scout – Todd Vasvari; Director of football analytics – Greg Starek; Head coach: Head coach – Shane Steichen; Assistant to the head coach – T. J. Ingels; Offensive coaches: Offensive coordinator – Jim Bob Cooter; Passing game coordinator – Alex Tanney; Quarterbacks – Cameron Turner; Running backs – DeAndre Smith; Wide receivers – Reggie Wayne; Tight ends – Tom Manning; Offensive line – Tony Sparano Jr.; Assistant offensive line – Chris Watt; Offensive quality control – Diego Ortiz; Offensive quality control – Brent Stocksill	Defensive coaches: Defensive coordinator – Lou Anarumo; Defensive line – Marion Hobby; Assistant defensive line – Kalon Humphries; Linebackers – James Bettcher; Assistant linebackers – Cato June; Pass game coordinator/secondary – Chris Hewitt; Defensive backs – Jerome Henderson; Defensive quality control – Jeremy Bruce; Defensive quality control – Dillon Doyle; Special teams coaches: Special teams coordinator – Brian Mason; Senior assistant special teams – Joe Hastings; Harriet P. Irsay fellow – Isabel Diaz; Support staff: Game management coordinator – Aditya Krishnan; Strength and conditioning: Director of sports performance – Mike Minnis; Performance science analyst – Mikey Blazejowski; Senior head strength and conditioning – Richard Howell; Strength and conditioning assistant – Zane Fakes; Strength and conditioning assistant – Tyrell Brown; Strength and conditioning assistant/performance therapist – Sam Khym; Applied sports science/conditioning – Doug McKenney; → Coaching staff → Front office → More NFL staffs

== Statistics and records ==
=== Season-by-season record ===
This is a partial list of the Colts' last five completed seasons. For the full season-by-season franchise results, see List of Indianapolis Colts seasons.

Note: The finish, wins, losses, and ties columns list regular season results and exclude any postseason play.

Legend
Super Bowl champions (1970–present)	Conference champions	Division champions	* Wild Card berth

Season	Team	League	Conference	Division	Regular season				Postseason results	Awards
Season	Team	League	Conference	Division	Finish	Wins	Losses	Ties	Postseason results	Awards
2019	2019	NFL	AFC	South	3rd	7	9	0	—	—
2020	2020	NFL	AFC	South	2nd*	11	5	0	Lost Wild Card Playoffs (at Bills) 27–24	—
2021	2021	NFL	AFC	South	2nd	9	8	0	—	—
2022	2022	NFL	AFC	South	3rd	4	12	1	—	—
2023	2023	NFL	AFC	South	3rd	9	8	0	—	—

=== Records ===
All-time Colts leaders
Leader	Player	Record	Years with Colts
Passing	Peyton Manning	54,828 passing yards	1998–2011
Rushing	Edgerrin James	9,226 rushing yards	1999–2005
Receiving	Marvin Harrison	14,580 receiving yards	1996–2008
Coaching wins	Tony Dungy	85 wins	2002–2008
Sacks	Robert Mathis	118 sacks	2003–2016
Interceptions	Bobby Boyd	57 interceptions	1960–1968

== Radio and television coverage ==
The Colts' flagship radio stations since 2007 are WFNI (1070 AM, currently silent but with its repeater signals at 93.5 FM and 107.5 FM continuing to function as "93.5/107.5 The Fan" using WIBC-HD2 as a signal source) and WLHK 97.1 FM. The 1070 AM frequency, then known as WIBC, had also been the flagship from 1984 to 1992 and from 1995 to 1997.

Matt Taylor is the team's play-by-play announcer, succeeding Bob Lamey in 2018. Lamey held the job from 1984 to 1991 and again from 1995 to 2018. Former Colts backup quarterback Jim Sorgi serves as the "color commentator". Mike Jansen serves as the public address announcer at all Colts home games. Jansen has been the public address announcer since the 1998 season.

The team's local TV carriage rights were shaken up in mid-2014 when WTTV's owner Tribune Media came to terms with CBS to become the network's Indianapolis affiliate as of January 1, 2015, replacing WISH-TV. With the deal, both Tribune Media stations, including WXIN (channel 59) carry the bulk of the team's regular-season games starting with the 2015 NFL season. Also as of the 2015 season, WTTV and WXIN became the official Colts stations and air the team's preseason games, along with official team programming and coach's shows, and have a signage presence along the fascia of Lucas Oil Stadium.

WISH's sister station WNDY-TV aired preseason games from 2011 to 2014, having replaced WTTV at that time.

=== Radio station affiliates ===
Stations that broadcast Colts games include:

==== Indiana ====
Indiana affiliates
City	Call Sign	Frequency
Alexandria	WMXQ	96.7 FM
Angola	WLKI	100.3 FM
Bedford	WBIW	1340 AM
Bloomington	WGCL	1370 AM
Columbus	WRZQ	107.3 FM
Crawfordsville	WIMC	103.9 FM
Evansville	WGBF	1280 AM
Fort Wayne	WOWO	1190 AM
Fort Wayne	WFWI	92.3 FM
Goshen	WYXX	97.7 FM
Greencastle	WREB-FM	94.3 FM
Indianapolis, Indiana	WFNI	1070 AM
Indianapolis, Indiana	WLHK	97.1 FM
Lafayette	WASK-FM	98.7 FM
Loogootee	WRZR	94.5 FM
Madison	WORX-FM	96.7 FM
Marion	WMRI	860 AM
Michigan City	WEFM	95.9 FM
Monticello	WMRS	107.7 FM
Mount Vernon	WMVI	106.7 FM
Muncie	WMUN	1340 AM
North Vernon	WJCP	1460 AM
Oxford	WIBN	98.1 FM
Plymouth	WTCA	1050 AM
Portland	WPGW	1440 AM
Portland	WZBD	92.7 FM
Richmond	WKBV	1490 AM
Rochester	WROI	92.1 FM
Rushville	WIFE-FM	94.3 FM
Santa Claus	WAXL	103.3 FM
South Bend	WUBU	102.3 FM
Sullivan	WNDI-FM	95.3 FM
Tell City	WTCJ	1230 AM
Terre Haute	WVIG	105.5 FM
Vincennes	WZDM	92.1 FM
Wabash	WJOT-FM	105.9 FM
Warsaw	WAOR	102.7 FM
Warsaw	WRSW	1480 AM
Washington	WWBL	106.5 FM

==== Illinois ====
Illinois affiliates
City	Call Sign	Frequency
Danville	WDAN	1490 AM
Decatur	WDZQ	95.1 FM
Effingham	WCRA	1090 AM
Mount Carmel	WYNG	94.9 FM
Olney	WVLN	740 AM

==== Kentucky ====
Kentucky affiliates
City	Call Sign	Frequency
Bardstown	WBRT	1320 AM
Eminence	WLUE	1600 AM
Henderson	WGBF-FM	103.1 FM
Louisville	WLRS	1570 AM
Owensboro	WVJS	1420 AM

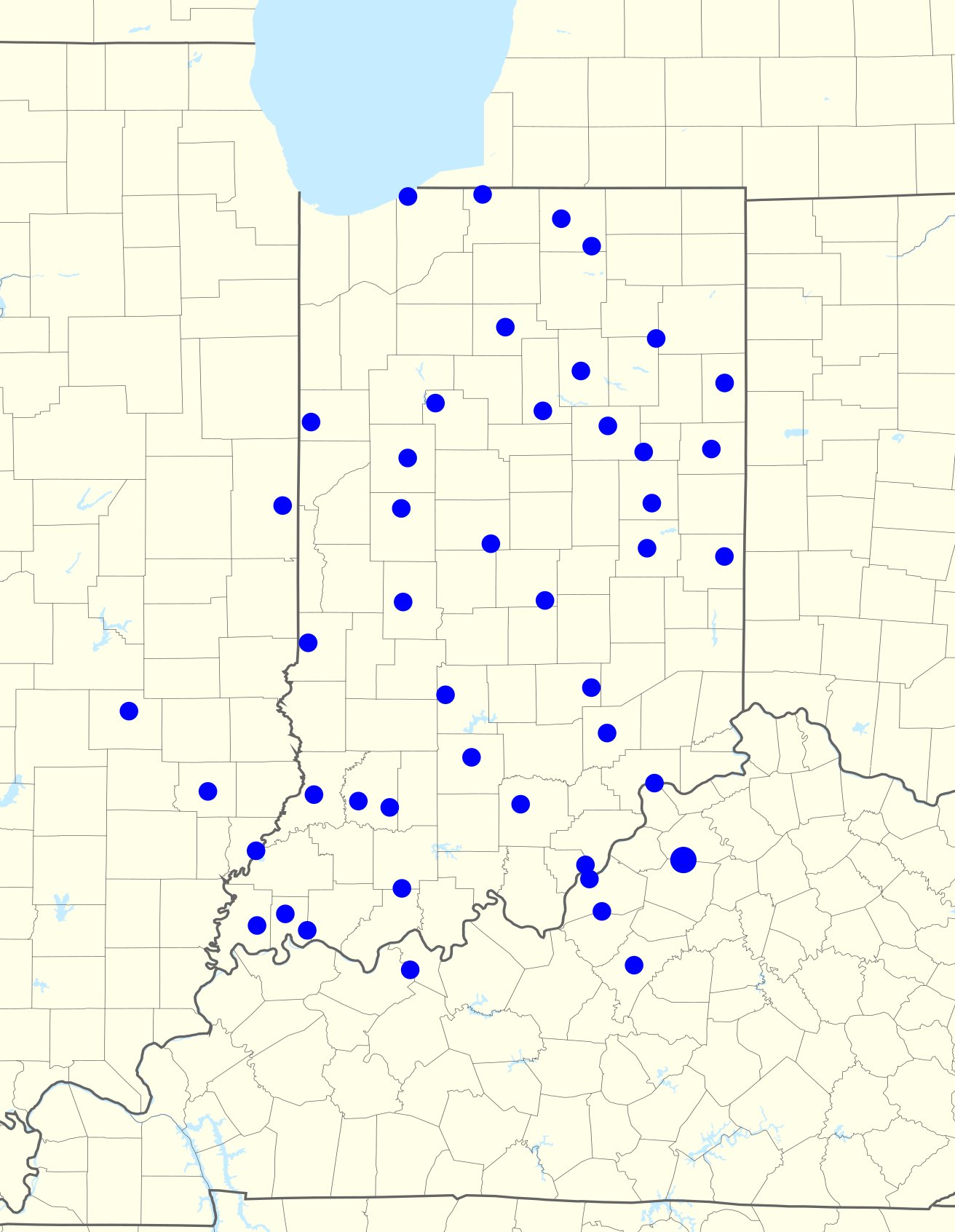
Map of radio affiliates
