= KTYG =

KTYG may refer to:

- KTYG-LP, a low-power radio station (106.7 FM) licensed to serve Centralia, Washington, United States
- KWJD-LP, a low-power radio station (92.1 FM) licensed to serve Onalaska, Washington, which held the call sign KTYG-LP from 2006 to 2016
