= WCNX =

WCNX may refer to:

- WNKU-LP, a low-power radio station (92.1 FM) licensed to serve Covington, Kentucky, United States, which held the call sign WCNX-LP from 2014 to 2021
- WSKP (AM), a radio station (1180 AM) licensed to serve Hope Valley, Rhode Island, United States, which held the call sign WCNX from 2004 to 2011
- WMRD, a radio station (1150 AM) licensed to serve Middletown, Connecticut, United States, which held the call sign WCNX from 1948 to 1996
