= CHPL-FM =

Coordinates: 54°49′24″N 112°19′08″W

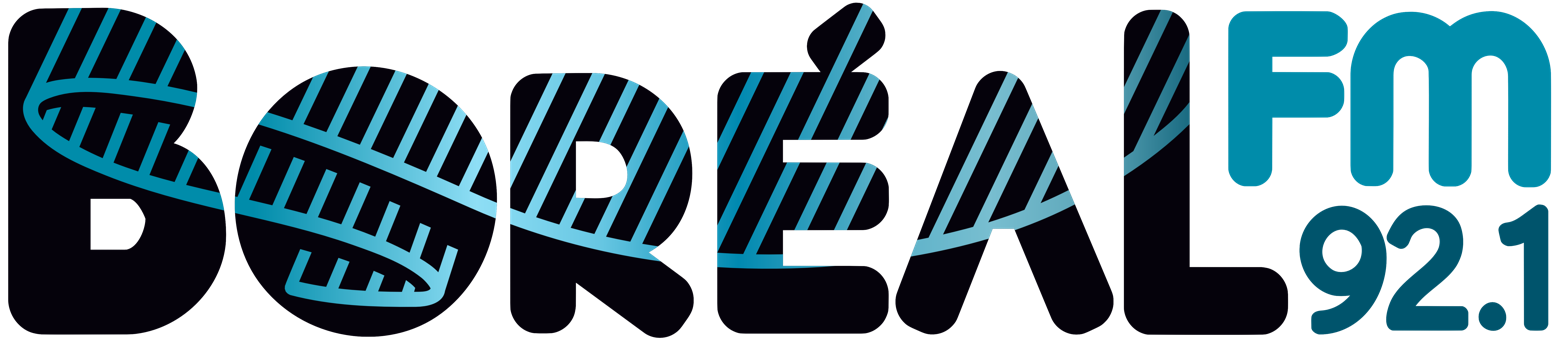
- Plamondon, Alberta; Canada
- Broadcast area: Plamondon, Lac La Biche
- Frequency: 92.1 FM
- Branding: Boréal FM

Programming
- Language: French
- Format: Community radio

Ownership
- Owner: Le club de la radio communautaire de Plamondon-Lac la Biche

History
- First air date: June 16, 2012

Technical information
- Class: A
- ERP: 1.215 kW
- HAAT: 128 metres (420 ft)

Links
- Webcast: Listen Live
- Website: borealfm.com

CHPL-FM, branded as Boréal FM, is a french-language community radio station that operates at 92.1 MHz (FM) in Plamondon-Lac La Biche, Alberta, Canada.

== History ==
On June 29, 2011, Le Club de la radio communautaire de Plamondon-Lac La Biche, received approval from the Canadian Radio-television and Telecommunications Commission (CRTC) to operate a new French language community radio station at Plamondon-Lac La Biche, Alberta.

The station launched on June 16, 2012.

On January 1, 2020, CHPL-FM was officially branded as Boréal FM. Since its new branding, most of its broadcasting hours focuses mainly on playing pop and new-country music, with the exception of various community member volunteers hosting a diverse lineup of themed radio shows and talkshows. These community operated shows include a rather impressive variety of music genres; they generally broadcast in the evenings.

The station is a member of the Alliance des radios communautaires du Canada and ARCOT.
