= XHOJF-FM =

Municipal radio station in Ocotlán de Morelos, Oaxaca

- Ocotlán de Morelos, Oaxaca; Mexico
- Frequency: 92.1 MHz
- Branding: Stereo Arkangel

Programming
- Format: Regional Mexican

Ownership
- Owner: Municipality of Ocotlán de Morelos

History
- First air date: November 30, 2011 (permit)

Technical information
- ERP: 3 kW
- Transmitter coordinates: 16°47′48.6″N 96°40′31.6″W

Links
- Website: web.archive.org/web/20151222130251/http://arkangelpatron.com/

XHOJF-FM is a radio station on 92.1 FM owned by the municipality of Ocotlán de Morelos in the state of Oaxaca.

== History ==
XHOJF was the second ever radio station in Mexico to be licensed directly to a municipality, after XHCUN-FM in Cancún. It was permitted in 2011, and testing began in early 2013.
