= XHCUN-FM =

Municipal radio station in Cancún, Quintana Roo

- Cancún, Quintana Roo; Mexico
- Frequency: 105.9 MHz
- Branding: Radio Cultural Ayuntamiento

Programming
- Format: Cultural

Ownership
- Owner: Presidencia Municipal de Cancún

History
- First air date: 1979
- Call sign meaning: CanCÚN

Technical information
- Licensing authority: CRT
- Class: B
- ERP: 30 kW
- HAAT: 6.3 m (21 ft)

Links
- Webcast: XHCUN-FM

XHCUN-FM 105.9 is a radio station in Mexico in Cancún, Quintana Roo, known as Radio Cultural Ayuntamiento. It is owned directly by the government of the municipality of Cancún and is the oldest station owned by a Mexican municipality. It was the only such station until XHOJF-FM, in Ocotlán de Morelos in Oaxaca, received its permit in 2011.
