= KGDL =

- Trent, Texas; United States
- Broadcast area: Abilene, Texas
- Frequency: 92.1 MHz
- Branding: CSN

Programming
- Format: Religious
- Affiliations: CSN International

Ownership
- Owner: CSN International

History
- First air date: 2012

Technical information
- Licensing authority: FCC
- Facility ID: 171016
- Class: C3
- ERP: 19,000 watts
- HAAT: 114 meters (374 ft)
- Transmitter coordinates: 32°38′05″N 100°07′51″W

Links
- Public license information: Public file; LMS
- Webcast: Listen Live
- Website: www.csnradio.com

KGDL is a radio station on 92.1 FM licensed to Trent, Texas, and serving the Abilene metropolitan area. It airs a Christian format, and is an owned and operated affiliate of CSN International.

== History ==
The construction permit for KGDL owned by KM Communications and was sold to Jose Antonio Aguilar before coming to air. It was first licensed in April 2012. The station aired a Regional Mexican format, with programming from MVS Radio's La Mejor network. It was silent for extended periods during Jose Antonio Aguilar's ownership. Effective November 3, 2020, the station was sold to CSN International for $85,000, and it began airing a Christian format. CSN International also purchased the station's tower site from Spaces For Towers LLC for $40,000 in a separate deal.
