= XHAZN-FM =

Radio station in Apatzingán, Michoacán

- Apatzingán, Michoacán; Mexico
- Frequency: 92.1 MHz
- Branding: La Pura Ley

Programming
- Format: Regional Mexican

Ownership
- Owner: Medios Radiofónicos de Michoacán; (Arturo Herrera Cornejo)

History
- First air date: June 25, 1991 (concession)
- Call sign meaning: ApatzingáN

Technical information
- Class: B1
- ERP: 10 kW

Links
- Website: radiomejor.mx

XHAZN-FM is a radio station on 92.1 FM in Apatzingán, Michoacán, affiliate to Medios Radiofónicos de Michoacán. It is known as La Pura Ley with a Regional Mexican format.

== History ==
XHAZN received its concession on June 25, 1991, broadcasting as the first FM station in Apatzingán. It was originally owned by Mario Ignacio Meléndez y Soto and sold to its current concessionaire in 1999.
