= XHITD-FM =

Radio station in Durango, Durango, Mexico

- Durango, Durango; Mexico
- Broadcast area: Durango
- Frequency: 92.1 FM
- Branding: Estéreo Tecnológico

Ownership
- Owner: Instituto Tecnológico de Durango; (Patronato Promotor para el Desarrollo del I.T.D., A.C.)

History
- First air date: April 4, 1990
- Call sign meaning: Instituto Tecnológico de Durango

Technical information
- ERP: 3 kW
- Transmitter coordinates: 24°01′31″N 104°40′11″W

Links
- Website: XHITD.com

XHITD-FM is a radio station in Durango, Durango. Branded as Estéreo Tecnológico, XHITD-FM broadcasts on 92.1 FM and is owned by the Instituto Tecnológico de Durango.

== History ==
XHITD signed on April 4, 1990 as the first FM station in the entire state of Durango.

The Instituto Tecnológico de Durango received a permit for an FM radio station in 1992. Originally badged XHDGO-FM and broadcasting on 97.3 MHz, within several months the callsign and frequency were changed. (The 97.3 frequency in Durango remains vacant, but the XHDGO-FM calls were reissued in 1994.)

XHITD does not appear in the most recent IFT table release, dated March 31, 2016, likely because it failed to apply to transition to a public or social use concession.
