= CFGR-FM =

First Nations radio station in Quebec, Canada

Coordinates: 58.695°N 65.956°W

CFGR-FM is a First Nations radio station which operates at 92.1 MHz (FM) in Kangiqsualujjuaq, Quebec, Canada.

On September 19, 1994, Jim Stewart received approval from the Canadian Radio-television and Telecommunications Commission to operate an English and native-language FM radio programming undertaking at Kangiqsualujjuaq, on the frequency 92.1 MHz, channel 221LP, with an effective radiated power of 10 watts.
