= WSVQ-LP =

- Charleston West Side, West Virginia; United States
- Frequency: 92.1 MHz
- Branding: WSVQ 92.1

Programming
- Format: Variety

Ownership
- Owner: Partnership of African American Churches

Technical information
- Licensing authority: FCC
- Facility ID: 196359
- Class: L1
- ERP: 100 watts
- HAAT: −71 metres (−233 ft)
- Transmitter coordinates: 38°21′56″N 81°39′45.20″W

Links
- Public license information: LMS
- Webcast: Listen Live
- Website: Official Website

WSVQ-LP (92.1 FM) is a radio station licensed to serve the community of Charleston West Side, West Virginia. The station is owned by the Partnership of African American Churches. It airs a variety radio format.

The station was assigned the WSVQ-LP call letters by the Federal Communications Commission on April 3, 2015.
