= KAGR-LP =

- Arapahoe, Nebraska; United States
- Frequency: 92.1 MHz
- Branding: Arapahoe Gospel Radio

Programming
- Format: Religious

Ownership
- Owner: The Evangelical Lutheran Trinity Cong. of Arapahoe, NE.

Technical information
- Licensing authority: FCC
- Facility ID: 196421
- Class: L1
- ERP: 79 watts
- HAAT: 31 metres (102 ft)
- Transmitter coordinates: 40°16′21″N 99°54′43″W

Links
- Public license information: LMS
- Website: Official Website

KAGR-LP (92.1 FM) is a radio station licensed to serve the community of Arapahoe, Nebraska. The station is owned by The Evangelical Lutheran Trinity Cong. of Arapahoe, NE. It airs a religious format.

The station was assigned the KAGR-LP call letters by the Federal Communications Commission on February 13, 2014.
