= KLQP =

Coordinates: 45.0269°N 96.1878°W

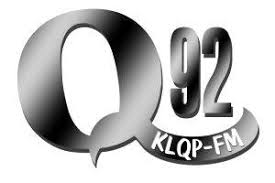
- Madison, Minnesota; United States
- Frequency: 92.1 MHz
- Branding: Q-92

Programming
- Format: Oldies rock/Classic country
- Affiliations: Fox News Radio

Ownership
- Owner: Adventures On The Air, LLC

History
- First air date: January 31, 1983
- Call sign meaning: Lac Qui Parle

Technical information
- Licensing authority: FCC
- Facility ID: 36198
- Class: C3
- ERP: 25,000 watts
- HAAT: 91 meters

Links
- Public license information: Public file; LMS
- Webcast: Listen Live
- Website: klqpfm.com

KLQP (92.1 FM) is a commercial radio station in Madison, Minnesota. It operates with an antenna 91 meters height above average terrain. The station was put on the air on January 31, 1983 by Maynard Meyer and Terry Overlander who formed Lac qui Parle Broadcasting Co., Inc. In 2020 Meyer became sole owner when he purchased Overlander’s shares of stock. In 2024 Meyer sold the station to Adventures On The Air, LLC., owned by Kerri Boyens. KLQP, also known as "Q-92" serves a 5-county area in western Minnesota and part of eastern South Dakota.

== History ==
KLQP-FM was developed by Maynard Meyer, who began looking in the late 1970s for a small Minnesota community that was underserved by existing radio stations and could receive a new FM frequency under Federal Communications Commission rules. Meyer, then working at KMRS in Morris, Minnesota, later wrote that he selected Madison because the nearest radio stations were in Morris, Marshall, Ortonville and Montevideo, leaving Madison as a likely location for a new local station.

The application and licensing process took about two years. The original investors were Meyer's father, Julian Meyer; Ron Overlander; and Ron Overlander's son, Terry Overlander. After the FCC construction permit was obtained, the company acquired three acres north of Madison for a 300-foot tower, obtained Federal Aviation Administration clearance, built a transmitter building at the tower site, and rented KLQP's first studio space on Madison's main street.

KLQP-FM signed on at about 3 p.m. on January 31, 1983, operating at 3,000 watts. Its first studio was located downtown in Madison. The station later operated from a mobile home at the tower site and from a house along Highway 75 before moving to the former Sears catalog-store building at 623 West 3rd Street. A biography of Meyer by the Pavek Museum's Minnesota Broadcasting Hall of Fame also credits Meyer and Terry Overlander with putting KLQP-FM on the air in Madison in 1983, and describes Meyer as the station's general manager, engineer and host.

During its early years, KLQP operated as a full-service small-market station. An early-1990s Minnesota Broadcasters directory entry for Madison 92.1 listed Lac qui Parle Broadcasting with Julian Meyer as president, Maynard Meyer as vice president, and Terry Overlander as secretary-treasurer. It listed the station's format as country during the day and rock at night, with AP wire service, 3,000 watts of power, a 300-foot antenna, and operating hours of 5:45 a.m. to 10 p.m.

The station later upgraded its facilities. KLQP applied in 1996 for a power increase, and Meyer wrote that the change improved the station's coverage by raising its power to 25,000 watts. The M Street Journal reported in October 1998 that KLQP had increased to 25,000 watts as a Class C3 station.

KLQP continued to emphasize local service. The station's published schedule includes local news, Minnesota News Network updates, Linder Farm Network reports, local sports, area news segments, listener-classified programming, community information and church services. NorthPine described KLQP in 2024 as a full-service classic hits station whose lineup included local news and updates from Fox News, the Minnesota News Network and Linder Farm Network.

In April 2020, Meyer bought Terry Overlander's remaining shares and became sole owner of the station. The FCC granted a voluntary transfer of control of KLQP, Facility ID 36198, from Terrence L. Overlander to Maynard R. Meyer on May 28, 2020.

In 2024, Kerri Boyens' Adventures on the Air LLC agreed to buy KLQP from Maynard Meyer's Lac Qui Parle Broadcasting for $275,000. The FCC accepted the assignment application for filing on May 8, 2024. The FCC granted the assignment of authorization from Lac Qui Parle Broadcasting Co., Inc. to Adventures on The Air, LLC on June 27, 2024. NorthPine reported that the sale closed on July 26, 2024.
