= 92.1 Capital FM =

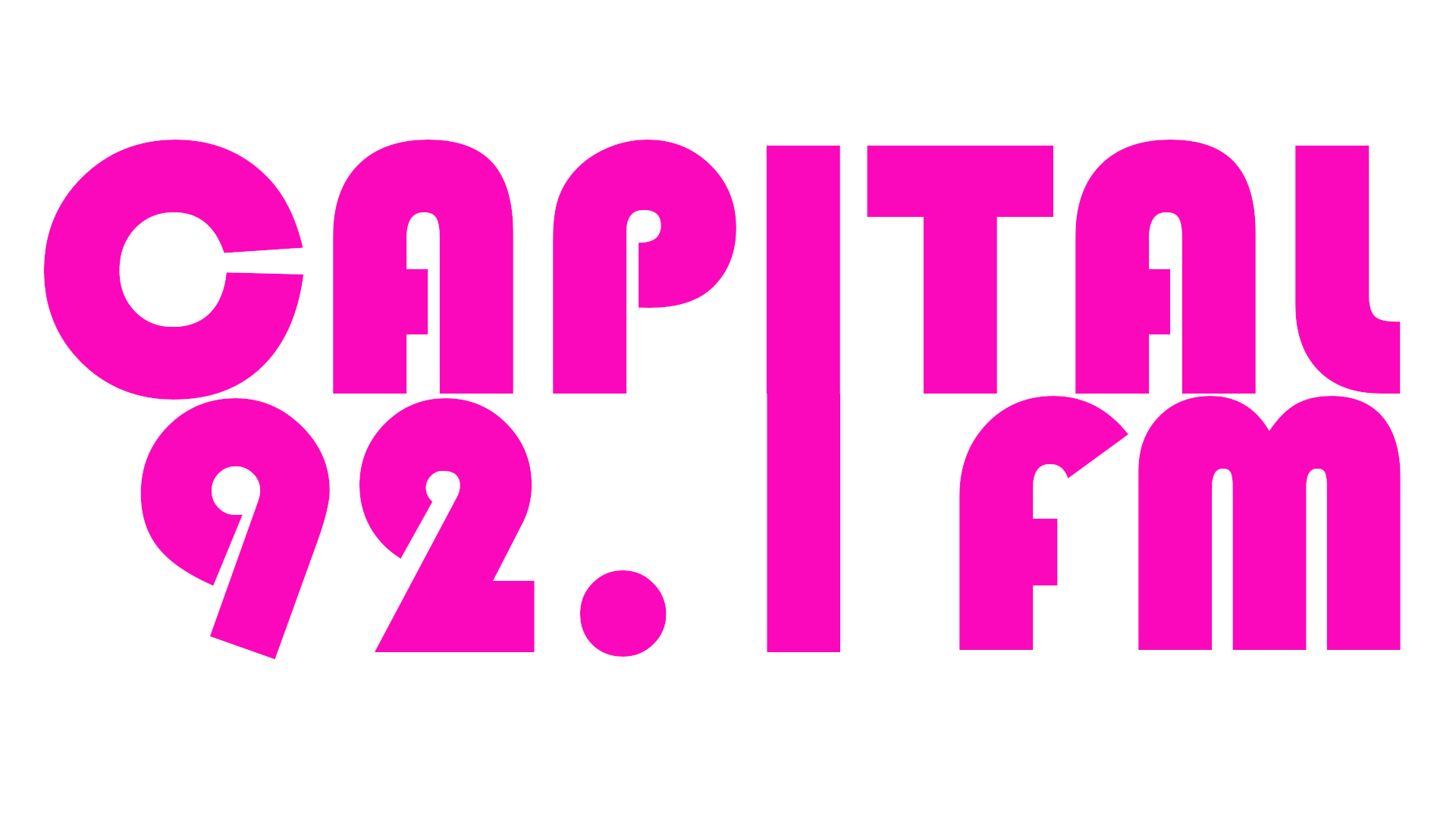

Fushë Kosovë; Kosovo
- Frequency: 92.1 MHz
- Branding: 92.1 Capital FM

Programming
- Language: Albanian

Ownership
- Owner: ALBATEC LLC.

History
- First air date: July 8, 2000
- Former call signs: Radio Drenasi

Technical information
- Class: R
- ERP: 1,000 watts
- Transmitter coordinates: 42°31′36.4″N 20°51′15.0″E

Links
- Website: https://www.capital921.com

92.1 Capital FM is a private commercial radio station in Kosovo. As of January, 2015 this radio station now broadcasts with a regional license covering almost half of the country from the mountain top of Berishë.

== Format ==
92.1 Capital FM broadcasts 24 hour program. Capital FM is licensed to broadcast on 92.1 MHz FM with a regional coverage, and also on the internet at its website.

92.1 Capital FM with its media content, the radio station has kept ties away from political affiliation and this is mainly due to its parent investors that are based in Canada. Of course, having no affiliation to any political groups it has missed opportunities to capitalize any funds from government media campaigns and corporations that are tightly linked to government officials. However, small businesses are its main source of revenue.

Today the radio station format aims more towards younger generation (ages 16–35) providing more of a mix of Albanian music with pop, rap, Albanian folk, and American music.

The late night show usually operates during the winter season that airs a talk show by the radio station director Lavdije Krasniqi and the sponsored clinical psychologist Hazir Elshani providing advice and information to its audience on health issues.

== History ==
After the war in Kosovo, in 1999 there was a vacuum of information and the station started operating in the Drenica region for the first time in history. Initially the radio station started providing information and news helping people connect, and at the same time broadcasting local music, programs and talk shows about the humanitarian relief, and dangers of landmines in the region with the coordination of KFOR, and UNMIK. Also, it was an important tool to heal wounds of a war torn region that suffered heavy civilian casualties during the last conflict in Kosovo.

The radio station with its former name Radio Drenasi began to operate on 8 July 2000 that started broadcasting 18 hours a day. In 2007 was licensed as a long term licensee by the Independent Media Commission (IMC). In 2013, after a financial difficulty due to bad management of the previous owner and in the brink of bankruptcy, the radio station was taken over by a Canadian-based company ALBATEC that started operating in Kosovo. In 2014, the radio station was re-licensed by the IMC in the ownership of that company.

As of August 2019 the shareholders of ALBATEC LLC. made the decision to change the operating name by branding it 92.1 Capital FM.

== Ownership ==
The radio station managing director in charge is Lavdije Krasniqi, and technical operations are managed by the Canadian-based firm ALBATEC CORP.

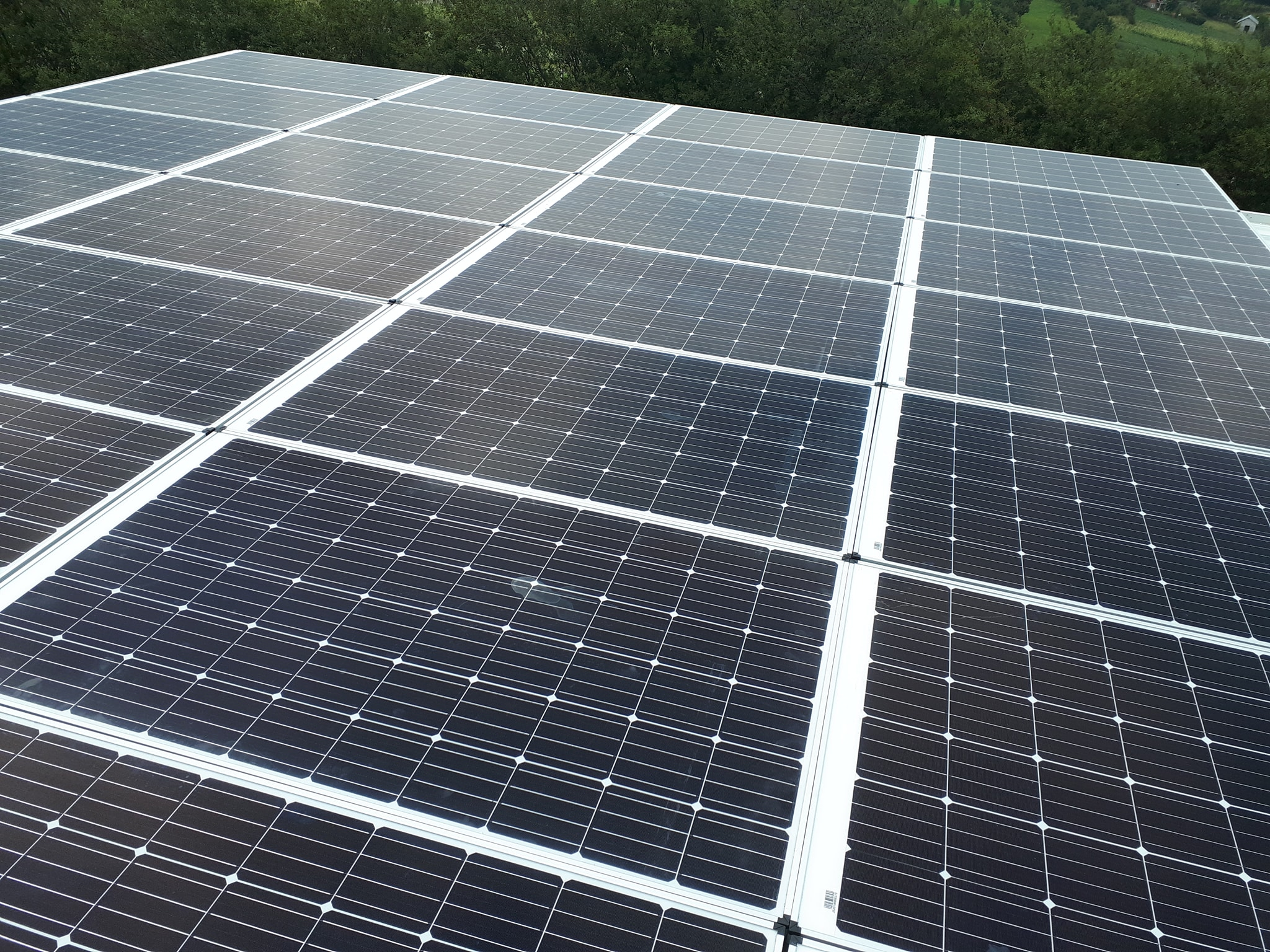
Solar Panels at Transmitter Tower Building

The radio station has its own broadcast site in the mountain top of Berishë that operates using solar energy with a capacity of about 10KW, and owns the new studio location in 272 Dardania St, Fushë Kosovë.

== Competition ==
After the station started broadcasting for the first time in the region, within a short time many other local and national radio stations started to operate and become their competition.

As the shows were taken over led by a respected show host Elsa Muja the radio station took a great success competing against national radio stations such as Radio Kosova, Radio Dukagjini, and other stations in Kosovo. Current shows are hosted by Luziana Tahiri, a song artist, and Luljeta Krasniqi a Psychology graduate student as two main show hosts.

The increase of coverage and technological advances in the studio and broadcasting network the radio station has a good coverage in the region. Despite difficulties with utility power from the power grid operator, the station has managed to take advantage of solar power and operate fully on solar during daylight making it the first and only broadcaster in Kosovo that uses alternative source of energy from the sun.
