= KREP =

- Belleville, Kansas; United States
- Frequency: 92.1 MHz
- Branding: "KR-92"

Programming
- Format: Country
- Affiliations: Fox News Radio

Ownership
- Owner: First Republic Broadcasting Corporation

Technical information
- Licensing authority: FCC
- Facility ID: 21627
- Class: C3
- ERP: 14,500 watts
- HAAT: 84 metres (276 ft)
- Transmitter coordinates: 39°45′0″N 97°36′48″W

Links
- Public license information: Public file; LMS
- Webcast: Listen Live
- Website: www.kr92country.com

KREP (92.1 FM) is a radio station licensed to serve the community of Belleville, Kansas. The station is owned by First Republic Broadcasting Corporation, and airs a country music format.

The station was assigned the KREP call letters by the Federal Communications Commission on December 27, 1983.
