= WMNC-FM =

- Morganton, North Carolina; United States
- Frequency: 92.1 MHz
- Branding: "Big Dawg 92.1 FM"

Programming
- Format: Country

Ownership
- Owner: Cooper Broadcasting

History
- Former call signs: WQXX (1977–1993)

Technical information
- Licensing authority: FCC
- Facility ID: 13832
- Class: C3
- ERP: 25,000 watts
- HAAT: 100 meters
- Transmitter coordinates: 35°45′09″N 81°43′19″W

Links
- Public license information: Public file; LMS
- Webcast: Listen Live
- Website: bigdawg92fm.com

WMNC-FM (92.1 FM) is a radio station broadcasting a New Country format. Licensed to Morganton, North Carolina, United States, the station is currently owned by Cooper Broadcasting Company and has been in the family since its sister station WMNC went on the air in 1947. In 2009, the station obtained a construction permit from the FCC for a power increase from 6,000 watts to 25,000 watts.
