= KZBX-LP =

Coordinates: 35°14′51″N 112°11′33″W

- Williams, Arizona; United States
- Frequency: 92.1 MHz

Programming
- Format: Oldies, Americana and classic country

Ownership
- Owner: KZBX LP THE CANYON of Williams, Arizona

Technical information
- Licensing authority: FCC
- Facility ID: 191859
- Class: L1
- ERP: 100 watts
- HAAT: −8.4 meters (−28 ft)

Links
- Public license information: LMS

KZBX-LP is a radio station licensed to Williams, Arizona, broadcasting on 92.1 FM. The station airs music from the 1950s through today. KZBX-LP is owned by KZBX LP THE CANYON of Williams, Arizona.
