= KFXI =

- Marlow, Oklahoma; United States
- Broadcast area: Lawton area
- Frequency: 92.1 MHz
- Branding: Foxy 92

Programming
- Format: Country music
- Affiliations: Fox News Radio

Ownership
- Owner: DFWU, Inc.

History
- Call sign meaning: "Foxy"

Technical information
- Licensing authority: FCC
- Facility ID: 3338
- Class: C1
- ERP: 100,000 watts
- HAAT: 166 meters (545 ft)
- Transmitter coordinates: 34°42′35″N 98°3′0″W

Links
- Public license information: Public file; LMS
- Website: kfxi.com

KFXI (92.1 FM, "Foxy 92") is a radio station licensed to Marlow, Oklahoma, United States, and serves the Lawton, Duncan and Chickasha areas. Owned by DFWU, Inc., the station carries a country music format and features programming from Fox News Radio.
