= WBHC-FM =

- Hampton, South Carolina; United States
- Frequency: 92.1 MHz
- Branding: GNN Radio

Programming
- Format: Christian Radio

Ownership
- Owner: Augusta Radio Fellowship Institute, Inc.

History
- First air date: July 26, 1978 (as WJBW-FM)
- Former call signs: WJBW-FM (1978–1984)
- Call sign meaning: We Build Hampton County

Technical information
- Licensing authority: FCC
- Facility ID: 25915
- Class: A
- ERP: 6,000 watts
- HAAT: 100 meters
- Transmitter coordinates: 32°50′38″N 81°7′32″W

Links
- Public license information: Public file; LMS
- Website: GNN Radio

WBHC-FM (92.1 FM) is a radio station broadcasting a Christian Radio format licensed to Hampton, South Carolina, United States. WBHC was named the "Adult Contemporary Radio Station Of The Year, 2014" by 'New Music Weekly Magazine', a radio/music industry trade publication. Additionally WBHC Program Director/Morning Personality Kevin 'KC' Coan was named "Adult Contemporary Program Director Of The Year". The station is owned by Augusta Radio Fellowship Institute, Inc.

== History ==
The station went on the air as WJBW-FM on July 26, 1978. On June 27, 1984, the station changed its call sign to the current WBHC-FM.
