= KXEZ =

Radio station in Farmersville, Texas

- Farmersville, Texas; United States
- Broadcast area: North/East Dallas–Fort Worth metroplex
- Frequency: 92.1 MHz
- Branding: The Possum

Programming
- Format: Classic country

Ownership
- Owner: Metro Broadcasters - Texas, Inc.
- Sister stations: KHYI

History
- First air date: September 1998
- Call sign meaning: "Easy 92" (original format)

Technical information
- Licensing authority: FCC
- Facility ID: 86121
- Class: A
- ERP: 1,650 watts
- HAAT: 193 meters (633 ft)
- Transmitter coordinates: 33°16′33.00″N 96°22′08″W

Links
- Public license information: Public file; LMS
- Webcast: Listen live

KXEZ (92.1 FM) is a commercial radio station licensed to Farmersville, Texas, United States, and primarily serves suburbs north and east of Dallas with a Classic Country format. KXEZ's studios are on Greenville Avenue in north Dallas, and the transmitter is located southeast of Blue Ridge in Collin County, near Texas State Highway 78.

== History ==
The station signed on the air in September 1998. It had a format of adult standards and big band music with live personalities from 6 a.m. to 6 p.m. It switched to the "Music of Your Life" standards format via satellite the rest of the broadcast day. The station was promoted as EZ (Easy) 92.1.

Personalities during that era included Hal Mayfield, Jack Bishop and Ray Harland.

In September 2005, KXEZ began airing an oldies format promoted as "Good Times Oldies" supplied by the Jones Radio Networks (now Dial Global) by satellite. Local traffic and weather reports were aired during mornings and afternoons.

Live, specialized oldies shows aired on Sunday nights during that period. KXEZ also broadcasts local high school sports including football, basketball, baseball and softball.

In December 2006, KXEZ switched to a Classic Country format provided by Dial Global. KXEZ was known as "The Possum" with recorded promos by country music legend George Jones. After Jones' passing in 2013, the station changed the promos to honor the late, great country legend.

In 2011, KXEZ's owner, Ken Jones, decided to end live traffic and weather reports, and the station became totally automated except for high school sports.
