= WYAS (FM) =

Radio station in Luquillo, Puerto Rico

- Luquillo, Puerto Rico; Puerto Rico
- Broadcast area: Puerto Rico
- Frequency: 92.1 MHz
- Branding: 92.1 FM Estación de la Familia / Candelita7

Programming
- Format: Contemporary Christian

Ownership
- Owner: La Estación de la Familia, Inc.; (Radio Sol 92 WZOL, Inc.)

History
- First air date: 1976; 50 years ago
- Former call signs: WZOL (1976–2009)

Technical information
- Licensing authority: FCC
- Facility ID: 2999
- Class: A
- ERP: 14,600 watts
- HAAT: 854.0 meters (2,801.8 ft)
- Transmitter coordinates: 18°19′54″N 65°41′11″W
- Translators: 92.1 WYAS-FM1 (Carolina); 92.1 WYAS-FM2 (Luquillo)

Links
- Public license information: Public file; LMS
- Website: estaciondelafamilia.com candelita7.com

WYAS (92.1 MHz, La Estación de la Familia y Candelita7) is an FM radio station broadcasting a Contemporary Christian format. Licensed to Luquillo, Puerto Rico, it serves the Puerto Rico area. The station is currently owned by La Estación de la Familia, Inc., and its licensee is held by Radio Sol 92 WZOL, Inc. WYAS is simulcasting on WYAS-FM1, licensed to Carolina, Puerto Rico and WYAS-FM2, also licensed to Luquillo, Puerto Rico.
