= 2ARM =

Coordinates: 30.5254°S 151.6649°E

- Australia
- Broadcast area: Armidale, New South Wales
- Frequency: FM: 92.1 MHz

Programming
- Format: Community radio

Ownership
- Owner: Community Radio

History
- First air date: February 1976

Technical information
- ERP: 2 kW

Links
- Website: Official website

2ARM FM is a community radio station that has been broadcasting since the late 1970s. It serves the Armidale area in New South Wales, Australia, as well as surrounding regions including Walcha, Uralla, and Guyra, along with the areas in between.

Permanent Community Broadcasting Licenses lasting five years were granted in 2012, 2017 and 2022, after operating from 2007 on Temporary Community Broadcasting Licenses (TCBL). These events in 2007 included a 28 September 2007 letter of representation from Mr. Tony Windsor MP for New England to Senator Helen Coonan Minister for Communications, Information Technology & the Arts.

The station is volunteer-based and is a member of the Community Broadcasting Association of Australia (CBAA). Neighboring CBAA-affiliated community radio stations are now found at Bellingen, Glen Innes, Inverell, Kempsey, Grafton, Walcha, Tamworth, Taree, Tenterfield, and Newcastle.

The current license holder is an incorporated association with the ABN of 30635647271. In June 2009, in consultation with its stakeholders and New South Wales Fair Trading, the application to NSW Fair Trading for a transfer of the existing NSW Co-operative to an NSW Incorporated Association was finalized.

== History ==
The earliest history of 2ARM is closely linked with that of 2UNE, the availability of FM technology for radio broadcasting, and the beginning of the community broadcasting sector of Australia. The first UNE students to broadcast did so out of the Armidale CBD studios of Armidale's commercial station 2AD until a studio and related equipment became available on campus.

Professor Neville Fletcher, a physicist and lecturer at the University of New England at the time, presented the idea of a campus radio station to the students. This led to letters to the postmaster-general requesting a license. Fletcher was born in Armidale in 1930 and has an entry on the Australian Academy of Science web page. He attended Armidale High School from 1942 to 1946. He later went to Harvard University, where he gained a PhD. He was a professor of physics at UNE from 1963 to 1983.

== Notes and references ==
- Investigation Report 2009
- Submission of 2UNE to Senate Committee
