= WHHR =

Christian radio station in Vienna, Georgia

- Vienna, Georgia; United States
- Frequency: 92.1 MHz
- Branding: Radio by Grace

Programming
- Format: Christian radio

Ownership
- Owner: Radio By Grace, Inc.

Technical information
- Licensing authority: FCC
- Facility ID: 165954
- Class: A
- ERP: 5,100 watts
- HAAT: 106.0 meters (347.8 ft)
- Transmitter coordinates: 32°09′16.6″N 83°47′54.63″W
- Translator: 104.9 W285GE (Albany)

Links
- Public license information: Public file; LMS
- Webcast: Listen Live
- Website: radiobygrace.com

WHHR (92.1 FM) is a Christian radio station licensed to Vienna, Georgia, United States. The station is owned by Radio By Grace, Inc.
