= WBIK =

- Pleasant City, Ohio; United States
- Broadcast area: Guernsey County
- Frequency: 92.1 MHz
- Branding: Classic Rock 92.1

Programming
- Format: Classic rock

Ownership
- Owner: Joel Losego; (AVC Communications, Inc.)
- Sister stations: WBNV, WCMJ, WILE, WILE-FM, WWKC

History
- First air date: December 18, 1998

Technical information
- Licensing authority: FCC
- Facility ID: 70555
- Class: A
- ERP: 6,000 watts
- HAAT: 51.6 meters (169 ft)
- Transmitter coordinates: 40°1′37.00″N 81°33′9.00″W

Links
- Public license information: Public file; LMS
- Website: yourradioplace.com/rock-92-1-wbik-fm

WBIK (92.1 FM, "Classic Rock 92.1") is a commercial radio station licensed to Pleasant City, Ohio, United States, featuring a classic rock format. Owned by Joel Losego, through licensee AVC Communications, Inc., the station serves Guernsey County in East Central Ohio. The WBIK studios are located in the Guernsey county seat of Cambridge, as is the station transmitter.
