= KHOS-FM =

- Sonora, Texas; United States
- Broadcast area: San Angelo, Texas
- Frequency: 92.1 MHz
- Branding: Today's Traditional Country

Programming
- Format: Classic country
- Affiliations: Texas State Network

Ownership
- Owner: TENN-Vol Corp.

History
- Former call signs: KVRN-FM (1978–1985); KHOS (1985–1987)

Technical information
- Licensing authority: FCC
- Facility ID: 60844
- Class: A
- ERP: 3,000 watts
- HAAT: 91 meters
- Transmitter coordinates: 30°33′33″N 100°37′54″W

Links
- Public license information: Public file; LMS
- Webcast: Listen live

KHOS-FM (92.1 FM, "Today's Traditional Country") is a radio station broadcasting a classic country music format. Licensed to Sonora, Texas, United States, radio station KHOS-FM serves the greater San Angelo area. The station is currently owned by TENN-Vol. Corp.

== History ==
The station was assigned the call sign KVRN-FM on August 17, 1978. On April 15, 1985, the station changed its call sign to KHOS, and on March 1, 1987, to the current KHOS-FM.
