= KWJD-LP =

- Onalaska, Washington; United States
- Frequency: 92.1 MHz

Programming
- Format: Religious

Ownership
- Owner: Valley Life Broadcasting, Inc.

History
- Former call signs: KTYG-LP (2006–2016)

Technical information
- Licensing authority: FCC
- Facility ID: 135319
- Class: L1
- ERP: 100 watts
- HAAT: 26.0 meters (85.3 ft)
- Transmitter coordinates: 46°35′36.3″N 122°36′50.4″W

Links
- Public license information: LMS
- Website: KWJD-LP website

KWJD-LP (92.1 FM) is a radio station broadcasting a religious format. Licensed to Onalaska, Washington, United States, the station is owned by Valley Life Broadcasting, Inc.

The station changed its call sign from KTYG-LP to KWJD-LP on June 27, 2016.
