= WNKU-LP =

Radio station in Covington, Kentucky

- Covington, Kentucky; United States
- Frequency: 92.1 MHz
- Branding: ClassX Radio

Programming
- Format: Classic rock

Ownership
- Owner: RGS Communications, Inc.

History
- Former call signs: WRHX-LP (2003–2012); WGIO-LP (2012–2014); WCNX-LP (2014–2021)
- Former frequencies: 107.9 MHz (2003–2014)

Technical information
- Licensing authority: FCC
- Facility ID: 135044
- Class: L1
- ERP: 48 watts
- HAAT: 43.1 meters
- Transmitter coordinates: 38°52′42″N 84°35′08″W

Links
- Public license information: LMS
- Website: www.classxradio.com

WNKU-LP (92.1 FM) is a radio station licensed to Covington, Kentucky, United States. The station is currently owned by RGS Communications, Inc.

On June 4, 2021, WCNX-LP became WNKU-LP, with no change in programming, in order to retain the call letters in the northern Kentucky area. They had previously belonged to the radio service of Northern Kentucky University, which was sold to the Bible Broadcasting Network in 2017 and is now WYHH.
