= WZDM =

- Vincennes, Indiana; United States
- Frequency: 92.1 MHz
- Branding: Wisdom 92.1

Programming
- Format: Adult contemporary

Ownership
- Owner: The Original Company, Inc.

History
- First air date: September 1988

Technical information
- Licensing authority: FCC
- Facility ID: 66214
- Class: A
- ERP: 4,100 watts
- HAAT: 122 meters
- Transmitter coordinates: 38°41′02″N 87°26′08″W

Links
- Public license information: Public file; LMS
- Webcast: Listen Live
- Website: www.wzdm.com

WZDM (92.1 FM) is a radio station broadcasting an adult contemporary format. Licensed to Vincennes, Indiana, the station is owned by The Original Company, Inc.
