= WROI =

Coordinates: 41°3′14″N 86°16′12″W

- Rochester, Indiana; United States
- Frequency: 92.1 MHz
- Branding: Giant FM

Programming
- Format: Hot AC
- Affiliations: ABC News Radio

Ownership
- Owner: Scott Huber and Johnny McCrory; (3 Towers Broadcasting Company, LLC)

History
- First air date: August 29, 1971

Technical information
- Licensing authority: FCC
- Facility ID: 3605
- Class: A
- ERP: 6,000 watts
- HAAT: 57 meters (187 ft)

Links
- Public license information: Public file; LMS
- Webcast: Listen Live
- Website: wroifm.com

WROI (92.1 FM) is a radio station broadcasting a hot adult contemporary format. The station is licensed to Rochester, Indiana, and is owned by Scott Huber and Johnny McCrory, through licensee 3 Towers Broadcasting Company, LLC.

== History ==
WROI began broadcasting August 29, 1971. It was owned by Fidelity Broadcasting Co. and aired a middle of the road (MOR) format. In 1983, the station was sold to Manitou Broadcasting for $240,000. In 1992, it was sold to Bair Communications for $250,000.

The station aired an adult contemporary format in the 1990s and early 2000s. It was branded "Lite 92.1". By 2005, WROI had adopted an oldies format. It would later shift to a classic hits format. In 2019, it was announced that the station would be sold to 3 Towers Broadcasting for $533,000. 3 Towers Broadcasting took operation of the station on August 1, 2019, and it adopted a hot adult contemporary format branded "Giant FM". The sale was consummated on November 15, 2019.
