= Edward Dodds =

Edward Dodds may refer to:

- Charles Dodds (Edward Charles Dodds, 1899–1973), British biochemist
- Ed Dodds American football executive and assistant general manager for the Indianapolis Colts
- Edward E. Dodds (1845–1901), Canadian soldier who fought in the American Civil War
