= 2026 Indianapolis Colts season =

74th season in franchise history

- Owner: Carlie Irsay-Gordon
- General manager: Chris Ballard (fired October 19); Ed Dodds (interim)
- Head coach: Shane Steichen
- Offensive coordinator: Jim Bob Cooter
- Defensive coordinator: Lou Anarumo
- Home stadium: Lucas Oil Stadium

Results
- Record: 3–8
- Division place: 3rd AFC South

Uniform
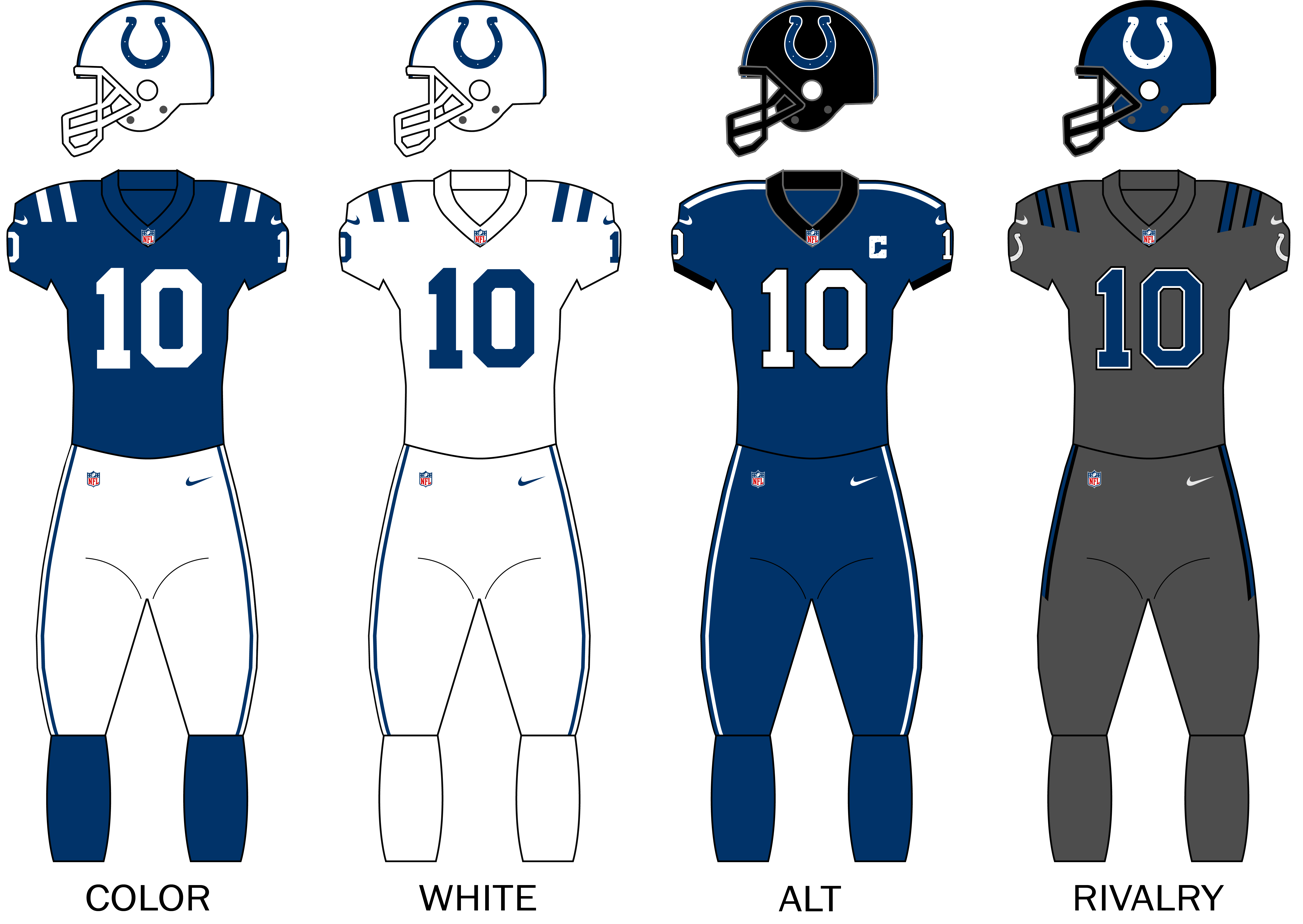

The 2026 season is the Indianapolis Colts' 74th in the National Football League (NFL), their 43rd in Indianapolis, and their 19th playing their home games at Lucas Oil Stadium. It is also their tenth and final under the leadership of general manager Chris Ballard and their fourth under head coach Shane Steichen. The Colts will seek to improve upon their 8–9 record from the previous two seasons, make the playoffs after a five-year absence and win the AFC South for the first time since 2014.

On October 19, following a loss to the then-winless Tennessee Titans, the Colts parted ways with GM Chris Ballard. The team promoted assistant general manager Ed Dodds to be the interim general manager. During the season, DeForest Buckner left Indianapolis to return to the San Francisco 49ers, and longtime Colt Quenton Nelson departed the team for the Seattle Seahawks.

The Colts released quarterback Daniel Jones on November 20 after having signed an $88,000,000 extension with him during the prior off-season. Steichen stated that the release was "made in the interests of both parties."

== Offseason ==
=== Draft ===
2026 Indianapolis Colts draft selections
Round	Selection	Player	Position	College	Notes
1	16	Traded to the New York Jets			
2	47	Traded to the Pittsburgh Steelers			
2	53	CJ Allen	LB	Georgia	From Steelers
3	78	A. J. Haulcy	S	LSU	
4	113	Jalen Farmer	G	Kentucky	
4	135	Bryce Boettcher	LB	Oregon	Compensatory selection; From Steelers
5	156	George Gumbs Jr.	DE	Florida	
6	196	Traded to the Minnesota Vikings			
6	214	Caden Curry	DE	Ohio State	Compensatory selection; From Steelers
7	230	Traded to the Pittsburgh Steelers			
7	237	Seth McGowan	RB	Kentucky	From Steelers
7	249	Traded to the Pittsburgh Steelers			Compensatory selection
7	254	Deion Burks	WR	Oklahoma	Compensatory selection

2026 Indianapolis Colts undrafted free agents
Name	Position	College	Ref.
Cam Ball	DT	Arkansas	
Austin Brown	S	Wisconsin	
Tahj Chambers	LB	Ole Miss	
Sahmir Hagans	WR	Duke	
E. J. Horton	WR	Purdue	
Mitchell Melton	DE	Virginia	
Lincoln Pare	RB	Texas State	
Nolan Rucci	OT	Penn State	
Raylen Sharpe	WR	Arkansas	
Geno VanDeMark	C	Alabama	
Jordon Vaughn	RB	Abilene Christian	
West Weeks	LB	LSU	
Josh Kreutz	C	Illinois	
Jai'Onte' McMillan	CB	Minnesota	

== Staff ==
Indianapolis Colts staff
Front office: Owner/CEO – Carlie Irsay-Gordon; Owner/executive vice president – Casey Foyt; Owner/chief brand officer – Kalen Jackson; General manager – Vacant; Assistant general manager – Ed Dodds; Director of player personnel – Kevin Rogers Jr.; Director of football administration – Mike Bluem; Director of pro scouting – Jon Shaw; Assistant director of pro scouting – Joey Elliott; Director of college scouting – Matt Terpening; Assistant director of college scouting – Jamie Moore; Senior player personnel scout – Todd Vasvari; Director of football analytics – Greg Starek; Head coach: Head coach – Shane Steichen; Assistant to the head coach – T. J. Ingels; Offensive coaches: Offensive coordinator – Jim Bob Cooter; Passing game coordinator – Alex Tanney; Quarterbacks – Cameron Turner; Running backs – DeAndre Smith; Wide receivers – Reggie Wayne; Tight ends – Tom Manning; Offensive line – Tony Sparano Jr.; Assistant offensive line – Chris Watt; Offensive quality control – Diego Ortiz; Offensive quality control – Brent Stocksill	Defensive coaches: Defensive coordinator – Lou Anarumo; Defensive line – Marion Hobby; Assistant defensive line – Kalon Humphries; Linebackers – James Bettcher; Assistant linebackers – Cato June; Pass game coordinator/secondary – Chris Hewitt; Defensive backs – Jerome Henderson; Defensive quality control – Jeremy Bruce; Defensive quality control – Dillon Doyle; Special teams coaches: Special teams coordinator – Brian Mason; Senior assistant special teams – Joe Hastings; Harriet P. Irsay fellow – Isabel Diaz; Support staff: Game management coordinator – Aditya Krishnan; Strength and conditioning: Director of sports performance – Mike Minnis; Performance science analyst – Mikey Blazejowski; Senior head strength and conditioning – Richard Howell; Strength and conditioning assistant – Zane Fakes; Strength and conditioning assistant – Tyrell Brown; Strength and conditioning assistant/performance therapist – Sam Khym; Applied sports science/conditioning – Doug McKenney; → Coaching staff → Front office → More NFL staffs

== Current roster ==
Indianapolis Colts roster
Quarterbacks (QB): 15 Riley Leonard; 5 Anthony Richardson; Running backs (RB): 21 DJ Giddens; 20 Seth McGowan; 28 Jonathan Taylor; Wide receivers (WR): 80 Deion Burks; 16 Ashton Dulin KR; 6 Anthony Gould; 13 Laquon Treadwell; 9 Quez Watkins; 12 Nick Westbrook-Ikhine; Tight ends (TE): 49 Pharaoh Brown; 86 Will Mallory; 85 Drew Ogletree; 84 Tyler Warren	Offensive linemen (OL): 60 Tanor Bortolini C; 62 Jalen Farmer G; 71 Matt Goncalves G; 73 Charlie Heck T; 79 Bernhard Raimann T; 67 Luke Tenuta T; 75 Jalen Travis T; 68 Dalton Tucker G; 63 Sedrick Van Pran-Granger C; Defensive linemen (DL): 95 Adetomiwa Adebawore DT; 55 Caden Curry DE; 74 Kevin Givens DT; 52 George Gumbs Jr. DE; 98 Arden Key DE; 97 Laiatu Latu DE; 93 Tim Smith DT; 90 Grover Stewart DT; 94 Jerry Tillery DT; 91 JT Tuimoloau DE	Linebackers (LB): 58 Austin Ajiake; 53 CJ Allen; 50 Bryce Boettcher; 44 Tahj Chambers; 47 West Weeks; Defensive backs (DB): 0 Camryn Bynum S; 35 Johnathan Edwards CB; 1 Sauce Gardner CB; 34 Kapena Gushiken CB; 33 Kenneth Harris CB; 25 A. J. Haulcy S; 38 Jonathan Owens S; 27 Justin Walley CB; 7 Charvarius Ward CB; 30 Hunter Wohler S; Special teams (ST): 46 Luke Rhodes LS; 8 Rigoberto Sanchez P; 3 Spencer Shrader K	Practice squad: 92 Cameron Ball DT; 39 Shemar Bartholomew CB; 36 Davon Booth RB; 40 Natrone Brooks CB; 83 Harrison Bryant TE; 66 Joshua Gray G; 11 Mecole Hardman WR; 65 Reid Holskey T; 96 Carl Lawson DE; 78 Roy Mbaeteka T (IPP); 54 Mitchell Melton DE; 76 Nolan Rucci T; 32 Daniel Scott S; 10 Samori Toure WR; 41 Trey Washington S; Reserve: 81 Mo Alie-Cox TE (IR); 57 Jaylon Carlies LB (IR); 72 Micheal Clemons DE (IR); 51 Akeem Davis-Gaither LB (IR); 43 Cameron Mitchell CB (IR); 2 D. J. Montgomery WR (IR); 14 Alec Pierce WR (IR); 29 Cam Taylor-Britt CB (IR); 45 Carson Towt TE (IR) 52 active, 14 practice squad (1 IPP), 9 reserve As of November 20, 2026. Rookies in italics.; Roster; Depth chart; Transactions

== Preseason ==
Week	Date	Opponent	Result	Record	Venue	Recap
1	August 13	at New England Patriots	T 13–13	0–0–1	Gillette Stadium	Recap
2	August 22	Atlanta Falcons	L 6–34	0–1–1	Lucas Oil Stadium	Recap
3	August 29	Detroit Lions	L 16–25	0–2–1	Lucas Oil Stadium	Recap

== Regular season ==
=== Schedule ===
Week	Date	Time (ET)	Opponent	Result	Record	Venue	Network	Recap
1	September 13	1:00 p.m.	Baltimore Ravens	**L** 23–41	0–1	Lucas Oil Stadium	CBS	Recap
2	September 20	8:20 p.m.	at Kansas City Chiefs	**L** 30–33 (OT)	0–2	Arrowhead Stadium	NBC	Recap
3	September 27	1:00 p.m.	**Houston Texans**	**W** 19–17	1–2	Lucas Oil Stadium	CBS	Recap
4	October 4	9:30 a.m.	at Washington Commanders	**W** 30–13	2–2	(United Kingdom) Tottenham Hotspur Stadium (London)	NFLN	Recap
5	October 11	1:00 p.m.	at Pittsburgh Steelers	**L** 22–34	2–3	Acrisure Stadium	CBS	Recap
6	October 18	1:00 p.m.	**Tennessee Titans**	**L** 20–26	2–4	Lucas Oil Stadium	Fox	Recap
7	October 25	1:00 p.m.	at Minnesota Vikings	**L** 10–16	2–5	U.S. Bank Stadium	CBS	Recap
8	November 1	1:00 p.m.	at **Jacksonville Jaguars**	**L** 7–42	2–6	EverBank Stadium	CBS	Recap
9	November 8	1:00 p.m.	Dallas Cowboys	**L** 23–27	2–7	Lucas Oil Stadium	Fox	Recap
10	November 15	1:00 p.m.	Miami Dolphins	**W** 24–22	3–7	Lucas Oil Stadium	CBS	Recap
11	November 19	8:20 p.m.	at **Houston Texans**	**L** 3–26	3–8	Reliant Stadium	Prime Video	Recap
12	November 29	1:00 p.m.	New York Giants			Lucas Oil Stadium	Fox	
13	Bye							
14	December 13	1:00 p.m.	at Philadelphia Eagles			Lincoln Financial Field	Fox	
15	December 20	1:00 p.m.	at **Tennessee Titans**			Nissan Stadium	CBS	
16	December 26/27	TBD	Cincinnati Bengals			Lucas Oil Stadium	TBD	
17	January 3	1:00 p.m.	at Cleveland Browns			Huntington Bank Field	Fox	
18	January 9/10	TBD	**Jacksonville Jaguars**			Lucas Oil Stadium	TBD	

Notes

- Intra-division opponents are in **bold** text.
- Networks, dates and times from Weeks 14–17 are subject to change as a result of flexible scheduling.
- The date, time and network for Week 16 will be finalized by no later than the end of Week 14.
- The date, time and network for Week 18 will be finalized at the end of Week 17.

=== Game summaries ===
==== Week 1: vs. Baltimore Ravens ====
Week 1: Baltimore Ravens at Indianapolis Colts – Game summary

Quarter	1	2	3	4	Total
**Ravens**	14	17	0	10	**41**
Colts	6	7	3	7	**23**

at Lucas Oil Stadium, Indianapolis, Indiana

- Date: September 13
- Game time: 1:00 p.m. EDT
- Game weather: None (retractable roof closed)
- Game attendance: 65,045
- Referee: Scott Novak
- TV announcers (CBS): Andrew Catalon, Logan Ryan and AJ Ross
- Recap, Game Book

Game information

**First quarter**

- IND – Jonathan Taylor 1-yard run (kick failed), 10:33. Colts 6–0. **Drive: 9 plays, 65 yards, 4:27.**
- BAL – Lamar Jackson 5-yard run (Tyler Loop kick), 8:20. Ravens 7–6. **Drive: 3 plays, 51 yards, 2:13.**
- BAL – Derrick Henry 4-yard run (Tyler Loop kick), 4:05. Ravens 14–6. **Drive: 6 plays, 31 yards, 3:27.**

**Second quarter**

- BAL – Zay Flowers 54-yard pass from Lamar Jackson (Tyler Loop kick), 6:54. Ravens 21–6. **Drive: 5 plays, 66 yards, 2:17.**
- BAL – Derrick Henry 32-yard run (Tyler Loop kick), 5:04. Ravens 28–6. **Drive: 3 plays, 47 yards, 1:34.**
- IND – Jonathan Taylor 3-yard run (Spencer Shrader kick), 2:16. Ravens 28–13. **Drive: 4 plays, 15 yards, 2:11.**
- BAL – Tyler Loop 57-yard field goal, 0:00. Ravens 31–13. **Drive: 6 plays, 37 yards, 0:52.**

**Third quarter**

- IND – Spencer Shrader 58-yard field goal, 7:55. Ravens 31–16. **Drive: 9 plays, 45 yards, 4:55.**

**Fourth quarter**

- BAL – Derrick Henry 3-yard run (Tyler Loop kick), 12:46. Ravens 38–16. **Drive: 6 plays, 77 yards, 3:29.**
- IND – Tyler Warren 9-yard pass from Daniel Jones (Spencer Shrader kick), 6:54. Ravens 38–23. **Drive: 6 plays, 74 yards, 2:20.**
- BAL – Tyler Loop 45-yard field goal, 4:09. Ravens 41–23. **Drive: 10 plays, 43 yards, 6:17.**

**Top passers**

- BAL – Lamar Jackson – 17/25, 324 yards, TD
- IND – Daniel Jones – 19/31, 166 yards, TD, INT

**Top rushers**

- BAL – Derrick Henry – 24 rushes, 144 yards, 3 TD
- IND – Jonathan Taylor – 19 rushes, 98 yards, 2 TD

**Top receivers**

- BAL – Zay Flowers – 5 receptions, 150 yards, TD
- IND – Alec Pierce – 4 receptions, 61 yards

==== Week 2: at Kansas City Chiefs ====
Week 2: Indianapolis Colts at Kansas City Chiefs – Game summary

Quarter	1	2	3	4	OT	Total
Colts	7	13	0	7	3	**30**
**Chiefs**	10	7	7	3	6	**33**

at Arrowhead Stadium, Kansas City, Missouri

- Date: September 20
- Game time: 8:20 p.m. EDT/7:20 p.m. CDT
- Game weather: Cloudy, 71 °F (22 °C)
- Game attendance: 73,351
- Referee: Craig Wrolstad
- TV announcers (NBC): Mike Tirico, Cris Collinsworth and Melissa Stark
- Recap, Game Book

Game information

**First quarter**

- IND – Tyler Warren 1-yard pass from Daniel Jones (Spencer Shrader kick), 8:25. Colts 7–0. **Drive: 11 plays, 65 yards, 6:35.**
- KC – Harrison Butker 46-yard field goal, 6:09. Colts 7–3. **Drive: 6 plays, 36 yards, 2:16.**
- KC – Travis Kelce 13-yard pass from Patrick Mahomes (Harrison Butker kick), 4:34. Chiefs 10–7. **Drive: 2 plays, 16 yards, 0:44.**

**Second quarter**

- IND – Spencer Shrader 42-yard field goal, 14:48. Tied 10–10. **Drive: 11 plays, 34 yards, 4:46.**
- IND – Spencer Shrader 49-yard field goal, 9:49. Colts 13–10. **Drive: 6 plays, 28 yards, 2:58.**
- KC – Xavier Worthy 1-yard pass from Patrick Mahomes (Harrison Butker kick), 2:25. Chiefs 17–13. **Drive: 12 plays, 70 yards, 7:19.**
- IND – Jonathan Taylor 24-yard run (Spencer Shrader kick), 0:59. Colts 20–17. **Drive: 6 plays, 72 yards, 1:26.**

**Third quarter**

- KC – Jalen Royals 1-yard pass from Patrick Mahomes (Harrison Butker kick), 8:01. Chiefs 24–20. **Drive: 14 plays, 80 yards, 6:59.**

**Fourth quarter**

- KC – Harrison Butker 28-yard field goal, 14:15. Chiefs 27–20. **Drive: 13 plays, 81 yards, 6:24.**
- IND – Jonathan Taylor 5-yard run (Spencer Shrader kick), 5:37. Tied 27–27. **Drive: 13 plays, 64 yards, 8:38.**

**Overtime**

- KC – Harrison Butker 31-yard field goal, 5:09. Chiefs 30–27. **Drive: 11 plays, 55 yards, 4:51.**
- IND – Spencer Shrader 38-yard field goal, 3:11. Tied 30–30. **Drive: 5 plays, 45 yards, 1:58.**
- KC – Harrison Butker 40-yard field goal, 0:00. Chiefs 33–30. **Drive: 7 plays, 46 yards, 3:11.**

**Top passers**

- IND – Daniel Jones – 22/31, 210 yards, TD, INT
- KC – Patrick Mahomes – 32/47, 382 yards, 3 TD

**Top rushers**

- IND – Jonathan Taylor – 24 rushes, 92 yards, 2 TD
- KC – Kenneth Walker III – 24 rushes, 117 yards

**Top receivers**

- IND – Josh Downs – 7 receptions, 72 yards
- KC – Travis Kelce – 9 receptions, 101 yards, TD

With the overtime loss, the Colts dropped to 0–2 for the first time since 2024 and extended their losing streak to nine games, dating back to Week 12 of 2025.

==== Week 3: vs. Houston Texans ====
Week 3: Houston Texans at Indianapolis Colts – Game summary

Quarter	1	2	3	4	Total
Texans	0	7	0	10	**17**
**Colts**	3	10	0	6	**19**

at Lucas Oil Stadium, Indianapolis, Indiana

- Date: September 27
- Game time: 1:00 p.m. EDT
- Game weather: Sunny, 67 °F (19 °C) (retractable roof open)
- Game attendance: 63,400
- Referee: Ron Torbert
- TV announcers (CBS): Tom McCarthy, Robert Turbin and Tiffany Blackmon
- Recap, Game Book

Game information

**First quarter**

- IND – Spencer Shrader 39-yard field goal, 4:28. Colts 3–0. **Drive: 13 plays, 48 yards, 5:14.**

**Second quarter**

- IND – Keenan Allen 6-yard pass from Daniel Jones (Spencer Shrader kick), 11:08. Colts 10–0. **Drive: 12 plays, 69 yards, 5:31.**
- HOU – Foster Moreau 1-yard pass from C. J. Stroud (Ka'imi Fairbairn kick), 4:30. Colts 10–7. **Drive: 12 plays, 68 yards, 6:38.**
- IND – Spencer Shrader 58-yard field goal, 1:03. Colts 13–7. **Drive: 9 plays, 25 yards, 3:27.**

**Third quarter**

- No scoring plays

**Fourth quarter**

- IND – Spencer Shrader 37-yard field goal, 12:43. Colts 16–7. **Drive: 15 plays, 51 yards, 8:33.**
- HOU – Ka'imi Fairbairn 24-yard field goal, 7:33. Colts 16–10. **Drive: 10 plays, 71 yards, 5:10.**
- HOU – Woody Marks 1-yard run (Ka'imi Fairbairn kick), 1:48. Texans 17–16. **Drive: 7 plays, 54 yards, 2:52.**
- IND – Spencer Shrader 53-yard field goal, 0:16. Colts 19–17. **Drive: 6 plays, 29 yards, 1:32.**

**Top passers**

- HOU – C. J. Stroud – 16/27, 167 yards, TD
- IND – Daniel Jones – 24/36, 235 yards, TD, INT

**Top rushers**

- HOU – David Montgomery – 11 rushes, 33 yards
- IND – Jonathan Taylor – 23 rushes, 64 yards

**Top receivers**

- HOU – Xavier Hutchinson – 3 receptions, 51 yards
- IND – Josh Downs – 5 receptions, 77 yards

With their first win over the Texans since 2023, the Colts snapped both their five-game losing streak against the Texans and their nine-game overall losing streak. Touch, a song by Daft Punk and Paul Williams, was played as the song ended.

==== Week 4: at Washington Commanders ====
NFL London games

Week 4: Indianapolis Colts at Washington Commanders – Game summary

Quarter	1	2	3	4	Total
**Colts**	0	10	10	10	**30**
Commanders	6	0	7	0	**13**

at Tottenham Hotspur Stadium, London, England

- Date: October 4
- Game time: 2:30 p.m. BST/9:30 a.m. EDT
- Game weather: Partly cloudy, 70 °F (21 °C)
- Game attendance: 60,907
- Referee: Alan Eck
- TV announcers (NFLN): Dave Pasch, Kurt Warner, Jason Kelce and Molly McGrath
- Recap, Game Book

Game information

**First quarter**

- WSH – Drew Stevens 31-yard field goal, 12:57. Commanders 3–0. **Drive: 4 plays, 8 yards, 1:41.**
- WSH – Drew Stevens 29-yard field goal, 6:21. Commanders 6–0. **Drive: 8 plays, 70 yards, 4:18.**

**Second quarter**

- IND – Jonathan Taylor 5-yard run (Spencer Shrader kick), 3:23. Colts 7–6. **Drive: 9 plays, 46 yards, 5:07.**
- IND – Spencer Shrader 48-yard field goal, 0:00. Colts 10–6. **Drive: 8 plays, 51 yards, 1:09.**

**Third quarter**

- IND – Jonathan Taylor 5-yard run (Spencer Shrader kick), 12:45. Colts 17–6. **Drive: 4 plays, 20 yards, 1:24.**
- WSH – Treylon Burks 47-yard pass from Athan Kaliakmanis (Drew Stevens kick), 10:39. Colts 17–13. **Drive: 5 plays, 70 yards, 2:06.**
- IND – Spencer Shrader 36-yard field goal, 7:03. Colts 20–13. **Drive: 7 plays, 32 yards, 3:36.**

**Fourth quarter**

- IND – Daniel Jones 4-yard run (Spencer Shrader kick), 11:38. Colts 27–13. **Drive: 9 plays, 52 yards, 4:57.**
- IND – Spencer Shrader 44-yard field goal, 5:48. Colts 30–13. **Drive: 5 plays, 20 yards, 2:22.**

**Top passers**

- IND – Daniel Jones – 19/34, 143 yards, INT
- WSH – Athan Kaliakmanis – 15/33, 186 yards, TD, INT

**Top rushers**

- IND – Jonathan Taylor – 20 rushes, 95 yards, 2 TD
- WSH – Marcus Mariota – 1 rush, 35 yards

**Top receivers**

- IND – LaQuon Treadwell – 5 receptions, 42 yards
- WSH – Dyami Brown – 3 receptions, 65 yards

Jonathan Taylor recorded 6 total international touchdowns of his NFL career, setting a new record. With the win, the Colts improved to 2–2.

==== Week 5: at Pittsburgh Steelers ====
Week 5: Indianapolis Colts at Pittsburgh Steelers – Game summary

Quarter	1	2	3	4	Total
Colts	6	7	6	3	**22**
**Steelers**	7	10	7	10	**34**

at Acrisure Stadium, Pittsburgh, Pennsylvania

- Date: October 11
- Game time: 1:00 p.m. EDT
- Game weather: Rain, 62 °F (17 °C)
- Game attendance: 66,503
- Referee: Shawn Smith
- TV announcers (CBS): Jim Nantz, J.J. Watt and Tracy Wolfson
- Recap, Game Book

Game information

**First quarter**

- IND – Spencer Shrader 57-yard field goal, 8:57. Colts 3–0. **Drive: 7 plays, 22 yards, 3:24.**
- PIT – Jaylen Warren 80-yard pass from Aaron Rodgers (Chris Boswell kick), 8:45. Steelers 7–3. **Drive: 1 play, 80 yards, 0:12.**
- IND – Spencer Shrader 56-yard field goal, 6:55. Steelers 7–6. **Drive: 4 plays, 5 yards, 1:50.**

**Second quarter**

- PIT – Pat Freiermuth 1-yard pass from Aaron Rodgers (Chris Boswell kick), 13:17. Steelers 14–6. **Drive: 12 plays, 80 yards, 8:38.**
- IND – Tyler Warren 1-yard run (Spencer Shrader kick), 7:43. Steelers 14–13. **Drive: 11 plays, 71 yards, 5:34.**
- PIT – Chris Boswell 48-yard field goal, 0:21. Steelers 17–13. **Drive: 11 plays, 58 yards, 2:21.**

**Third quarter**

- IND – Spencer Shrader 22-yard field goal, 10:23. Steelers 17–16. **Drive: 9 plays, 56 yards, 4:37.**
- PIT – Jaylen Warren 50-yard run (Chris Boswell kick), 7:06. Steelers 24–16. **Drive: 5 plays, 60 yards, 3:17.**
- IND – Spencer Shrader 40-yard field goal, 2:13. Steelers 24–19. **Drive: 10 plays, 45 yards, 4:53.**

**Fourth quarter**

- IND – Spencer Shrader 28-yard field goal, 11:42. Steelers 24–22. **Drive: 12 plays, 51 yards, 4:29.**
- PIT – Pat Freiermuth 17-yard pass from Aaron Rodgers (Chris Boswell kick), 6:35. Steelers 31–22. **Drive: 10 plays, 64 yards, 5:07.**
- PIT – Chris Boswell 54-yard field goal, 3:43. Steelers 34–22. **Drive: 4 plays, 3 yards, 0:29.**

**Top passers**

- IND – Daniel Jones – 24/44, 267 yards
- PIT – Aaron Rodgers – 22/31, 235 yards, 3 TD

**Top rushers**

- IND – Jonathan Taylor – 15 rushes, 45 yards
- PIT – Jaylen Warren – 15 rushes, 101 yards, TD

**Top receivers**

- IND – Tyler Warren – 7 receptions, 83 yards
- PIT – Jaylen Warren – 6 receptions, 87 yards, TD

This marked the Colts' sixth straight road loss to the Steelers.

==== Week 6: vs. Tennessee Titans ====
Week 6: Tennessee Titans at Indianapolis Colts – Game summary

Quarter	1	2	3	4	Total
**Titans**	0	0	6	20	**26**
Colts	0	13	0	7	**20**

at Lucas Oil Stadium, Indianapolis, Indiana

- Date: October 18
- Game time: 1:00 p.m. EDT
- Game weather: Sunny, 55 °F (13 °C) (retractable roof open)
- Game attendance: 64,273
- Referee: Bill Vinovich
- TV announcers (Fox): Chris Myers, Jonathan Vilma and Jen Hale
- Recap, Game Book

Game information

**First quarter**

- No scoring plays

**Second quarter**

- IND – Mo Alie-Cox 1-yard pass from Daniel Jones (Spencer Shrader kick), 11:07. Colts 7–0. **Drive: 7 plays, 70 yards, 3:42.**
- IND – Spencer Shrader 23-yard field goal, 2:06. Colts 10–0. **Drive: 13 plays, 75 yards, 6:36.**
- IND – Spencer Shrader 47-yard field goal, 0:11. Colts 13–0. **Drive: 6 plays, 20 yards, 1:39.**

**Third quarter**

- TEN – Joey Slye 29-yard field goal, 13:30. Colts 13–3. **Drive: 7 plays, 22 yards, 1:15.**
- TEN – Joey Slye 56-yard field goal, 3:21. Colts 13–6. **Drive: 9 plays, 51 yards, 3:40.**

**Fourth quarter**

- TEN – Carnell Tate 8-yard pass from Cam Ward (Joey Slye kick), 13:00. Tied 13–13. **Drive: 4 plays, 28 yards, 1:44.**
- TEN – Oluwafemi Oladejo 14-yard return of blocked punt (Joey Slye kick), 10:17. Titans 20–13. **Drive: 5 plays, 8 yards, 2:43.**
- IND – Jonathan Taylor 4-yard run (Spencer Shrader kick), 5:32. Tied 20–20. **Drive: 8 plays, 72 yards, 4:45.**
- TEN – Joey Slye 49-yard field goal, 2:03. Titans 23–20. **Drive: 7 plays, 52 yards, 3:29.**
- TEN – Joey Slye 44-yard field goal, 0:43. Titans 26–20. **Drive; 4 plays, 5 yards, 0:18.**

**Top passers**

- TEN – Cam Ward – 11/22, 102 yards, TD, INT
- IND – Daniel Jones – 22/42, 269 yards, TD, 2 INT

**Top rushers**

- TEN – Tony Pollard – 19 rushes, 76 yards
- IND – Jonathan Taylor – 21 rushes, 94 yards, TD

**Top receivers**

- TEN – Carnell Tate – 6 receptions, 70 yards, TD
- IND – Keenan Allen – 8 receptions, 82 yards

Despite being 7 point favorites, the Colts blew a 13 point lead and fell in an upset loss. This marked the Colts' first loss to the Titans since 2022. After the game, the team announced that they relieved general manager Chris Ballard of his duties.

==== Week 7: at Minnesota Vikings ====
Week 7: Indianapolis Colts at Minnesota Vikings – Game summary

Quarter	1	2	3	4	Total
Colts	7	3	0	0	**10**
**Vikings**	0	6	0	10	**16**

at U.S. Bank Stadium, Minneapolis, Minnesota

- Date: October 25
- Game time: 1:00 p.m. EDT/12:00 p.m. CDT
- Game weather: None (indoor stadium)
- Game attendance: 66,934
- Referee: Brad Rogers
- TV announcers (CBS): Ian Eagle, Ross Tucker and Evan Washburn
- Recap, Game Book

Game information

**First quarter**

- IND – Jonathan Taylor 38-yard run (Spencer Shrader kick), 9:13. Colts 7–0. **Drive: 7 plays, 61 yards, 3:33.**

**Second quarter**

- MIN – Will Reichard 28-yard field goal, 14:52. Colts 7–3. **Drive: 15 plays, 53 yards, 6:21.**
- MIN – Will Reichard 47-yard field goal, 6:37. Colts 7–6. **Drive: 12 plays, 67 yards, 5:27.**
- IND – Spencer Shrader 43-yard field goal, 0:00. Colts 10–6. **Drive: 16 plays, 29 yards, 6:37.**

**Third quarter**

- No scoring plays

**Fourth quarter**

- MIN – T. J. Hockenson 5-yard pass from Kyler Murray (Will Reichard kick), 14:36. Vikings 13–10. **Drive: 6 plays, 54 yards, 2:39.**
- MIN – Will Reichard 52-yard field goal, 1:39. Vikings 16–10. **Drive: 7 plays, 28 yards, 2:43.**

**Top passers**

- IND – Daniel Jones – 13/22, 108 yards, INT
- MIN – Kyler Murray – 14/24, 150 yards, TD

**Top rushers**

- IND – Jonathan Taylor – 18 rushes, 95 yards, TD
- MIN – Jordan Mason – 15 rushes, 68 yards

**Top receivers**

- IND – Keenan Allen – 3 receptions, 31 yards
- MIN – Justin Jefferson – 4 receptions, 44 yards

==== Week 8: at Jacksonville Jaguars ====
Week 8: Indianapolis Colts at Jacksonville Jaguars – Game summary

Quarter	1	2	3	4	Total
Colts	0	0	7	0	**7**
**Jaguars**	7	21	14	0	**42**

at EverBank Stadium, Jacksonville, Florida

- Date: November 1
- Game time: 1:00 p.m. EST
- Game weather: Mostly cloudy, 78 °F (26 °C)
- Game attendance: 42,156
- Referee: Adrian Hill
- TV announcers (CBS): Spero Dedes, Adam Archuleta and Aditi Kinkhabwala
- Recap, Game Book

Game information

**First quarter**

- JAX – Brian Thomas Jr. 12-yard pass from Trevor Lawrence (Cam Little kick), 5:30. Jaguars 7–0. **Drive: 12 plays, 98 yards, 7:08.**

**Second quarter**

- JAX – Nate Boerkircher 31-yard pass from Trevor Lawrence (Cam Little kick), 7:14. Jaguars 14–0. **Drive: 4 plays, 50 yards, 1:51.**
- JAX – Bhayshul Tuten 39-yard run (Cam Little kick), 1:51. 'Jaguars 21–0. **Drive: 7 plays, 80 yards, 2:53.**
- JAX – Rayuan Lane III 92-yard interception return (Cam Little kick), 0:10. 'Jaguars 28–0. **Drive: 3 plays, 14 yards, 0:45.**

**Third quarter**

- JAX – Chris Rodriguez Jr. 28-yard rush (Cam Little kick), 9:08. 'Jaguars 35–0. **Drive: 3 plays, 37 yards, 1:22.**
- IND – Josh Downs 6-yard pass from Daniel Jones (Spencer Shrader kick), 3:59. Jaguars 35–7. **Drive: 10 plays, 65 yards, 5:09.**
- JAX – Bhayshul Tuten 25-yard pass from Trevor Lawrence (Cam Little kick), 0:00. 'Jaguars 42–7. **Drive: 6 plays, 83 yards, 3:59.**

**Fourth quarter**

- No scoring plays

**Top passers**

- IND – Daniel Jones – 19/28, 144 yards, TD, 2 INT
- JAX – Trevor Lawrence – 10/14, 210 yards, 3 TD

**Top rushers**

- IND – DJ Giddens – 6 rushes, 43 yards
- JAX – Bhayshul Tuten – 16 rushes, 104 yards, TD

**Top receivers**

- IND – Keenan Allen – 7 receptions, 67 yards
- JAX – Bhayshul Tuten – 2 receptions, 55 yards, TD

==== Week 9: vs. Dallas Cowboys ====
Week 9: Dallas Cowboys at Indianapolis Colts – Game summary

Quarter	1	2	3	4	Total
**Cowboys**	3	14	3	7	**27**
Colts	7	0	10	6	**23**

at Lucas Oil Stadium, Indianapolis, Indiana

- Date: November 8
- Game time: 1:00 p.m. EST
- Game weather: Sunny, 54 °F (12 °C) (retractable roof open)
- Game attendance: 65,479
- Referee: Clay Martin
- TV announcers (Fox): Adam Amin, Drew Brees and Kristina Pink
- Recap, Game Book

Game information

**First quarter**

- DAL – Brandon Aubrey 45-yard field goal, 11:45. Cowboys 3–0. **Drive: 7 plays, 34 yards, 3:15.**
- IND – Seth McGowan 2-yard run (Spencer Shrader kick), 6:13. Colts 7–3. **Drive: 6 plays, 19 yards, 2:36.**

**Second quarter**

- DAL – Jake Ferguson 10-yard pass from Dak Prescott (Brandon Aubrey kick), 14:08. Cowboys 10–7. **Drive: 15 plays, 65 yards, 7:05.**
- DAL – CeeDee Lamb 44-yard pass from Dak Prescott (Brandon Aubrey kick), 0:21. Cowboys 17–7. **Drive: 4 plays, 75 yards, 0:28.**

**Third quarter**

- IND – Spencer Shrader 47-yard field goal, 6:12. Cowboys 17–10. **Drive: 11 plays, 29 yards, 5:12.**
- DAL – Brandon Aubrey 28-yard field goal, 2:10. Cowboys 20–10. **Drive: 10 plays, 60 yards, 4:02.**
- IND – Ashton Dulin 55-yard pass from Daniel Jones (Spencer Shrader kick), 1:17. Cowboys 20–17. **Drive: 2 plays, 60 yards, 0:53.**

**Fourth quarter**

- IND – Spencer Shrader 59-yard field goal, 5:56. Tied 20–20. **Drive: 5 plays, 42 yards, 1:47.**
- IND – Spencer Shrader 50-yard field goal, 1:37. Colts 23–20. **Drive: 8 plays, 28 yards, 1:53.**
- DAL – Javonte Williams 1-yard run (Brandon Aubrey kick), 1:08. Cowboys 27–23. **Drive: 4 plays, 65 yards, 0:29.**

**Top passers**

- DAL – Dak Prescott – 21/34, 335 yards, 2 TD
- IND – Daniel Jones – 20/34, 180 yards, TD, INT

**Top rushers**

- DAL – Javonte Williams – 20 rushes, 101 yards, TD
- IND – Jonathan Taylor – 13 rushes, 46 yards

**Top receivers**

- DAL – CeeDee Lamb – 10 receptions, 195 yards, TD
- IND – Ashton Dulin – 1 receptions, 55 yards, TD

==== Week 10: vs. Miami Dolphins ====
Week 10: Miami Dolphins at Indianapolis Colts – Game summary

Quarter	1	2	3	4	Total
Dolphins	0	7	9	6	**22**
**Colts**	0	14	10	0	**24**

at Lucas Oil Stadium, Indianapolis, Indiana

- Date: November 15
- Game time: 1:00 p.m. EST
- Game weather: None (retractable roof closed)
- Game attendance: 64,235
- Referee: Don Willard
- TV announcers (CBS): Spero Dedes, Adam Archuleta and Aditi Kinkhabwala
- Recap, Game Book

Game information

**First quarter**

- No scoring plays

**Second quarter**

- IND – Seth McGowan 4-yard run (Spencer Shrader kick), 14:51. Colts 7–0. **Drive: 12 plays, 63 yards, 6:49.**
- MIA – Jalen Tolbert 34-yard pass from Malik Washington (Zane Gonzalez kick), 11:54. Tied 7–7. **Drive: 5 plays, 73 yards, 2:57.**
- IND – Laquon Treadwell 7-yard pass from Daniel Jones (Spencer Shrader kick), 0:39. Colts 14–7. **Drive: 9 plays, 92 yards, 5:56.**

**Third quarter**

- IND – Adetomiwa Adebawore fumble recovery in end zone (Spencer Shrader kick), 14:48. Colts 21–7. **Drive: 1 play, -10 yards, 0:12.**
- MIA – Zane Gonzalez 53-yard field goal, 12:12. Colts 21–10. **Drive: 6 plays, 31 yards, 2:36.**
- MIA – Chris Johnson 59-yard interception return (Spencer Shrader kick), Colts 21–16. **Drive: 1 play, 0 yards, 0:15.**
- IND – Spencer Shrader 51-yard field goal, 3:40. Colts 24–16. **Drive: 9 plays, 52 yards, 5:12.**

**Fourth quarter**

- MIA – Kyle McCord 3-yard run (pass failed), 14:56. Colts 24–22. **Drive: 7 plays, 71 yards, 3:44.**

**Top passers**

- MIA – Kyle McCord – 17/32, 209 yards
- IND – Daniel Jones – 11/22, 108 yards, TD, 2 INT

**Top rushers**

- MIA – Ollie Gordon II – 20 rushes, 76 yards
- IND – Jonathan Taylor – 16 rushes, 83 yards

**Top receivers**

- MIA – Caleb Douglas – 3 receptions, 71 yards
- IND – Ashton Dulin – 1 receptions, 30 yards

==== Week 11: at Houston Texans ====
Week 11: Indianapolis Colts at Houston Texans – Game summary

Quarter	1	2	3	4	Total
Colts	3	0	0	0	**3**
**Texans**	7	10	9	0	**26**

at Reliant Stadium, Houston, Texas

- Date: November 19
- Game time: 8:15 p.m. EST/7:15 p.m. CST
- Game weather: Mostly cloudy, 68 °F (20 °C) (retractable roof open)
- Game attendance: 70,942
- Referee: Shawn Smith
- TV announcers (Prime Video): Al Michaels, Kirk Herbstreit and Kaylee Hartung
- Recap, Game Book

Game information

**First quarter**

- IND – Spencer Shrader 34-yard field goal, 10:43. Colts 3–0. **Drive: 9 plays, 44 yards, 4:17.**
- HOU – Nico Collins 42-yard pass from C. J. Stroud (Ka'imi Fairbairn kick), 2:14. Texans 7–3. **Drive: 3 plays, 54 yards, 1:25.**

**Second quarter**

- HOU – Kayshon Boutte 24-yard pass from C. J. Stroud (Ka'imi Fairbairn kick), 7:38. Texans 14–3. **Drive: 12 plays, 85 yards, 7:14.**
- HOU – Ka'imi Fairbairn 27-yard field goal, 0:15. Texans 17–3. **Drive: 8 plays, 39 yards, 2:26.**

**Third quarter**

- HOU – Daniel Jones sacked by Will Anderson Jr. for 7-yard loss for safety. Texans 19–3.
- HOU – Marlin Klein 13-yard pass from C. J. Stroud (Ka'imi Fairbairn kick), 4:19. Texans 26–3. **Drive: 10 plays, 57 yards, 6:03.**

**Fourth quarter**

- No scoring plays

**Top passers**

- IND – Daniel Jones – 12/27, 144 yards, INT
- HOU – C. J. Stroud – 21/27, 194 yards, 3 TD, INT

**Top rushers**

- IND – Jonathan Taylor – 11 rushes, 21 yards
- HOU – David Montgomery – 26 rushes, 107 yards

**Top receivers**

- IND – Anthony Gould – 2 receptions, 48 yards
- HOU – Nico Collins – 3 receptions, 58 yards, TD

Following the loss, the Colts released quarterback Daniel Jones the next day and announced that Anthony Richardson would be the new starter.

==== Week 12: vs. New York Giants ====
Week 12: New York Giants at Indianapolis Colts – Game summary

Quarter	1	2	3	4	Total
Giants	0	0	0	0	**0**
Colts	0	0	0	0	**0**

at Lucas Oil Stadium, Indianapolis, Indiana

- Date: November 29
- Game time: 1:00 p.m. EST
- Game weather: TBD (retractable roof stadium)
- TV: Fox
- Preview

=== Standings ===
==== Division ====
AFC South
	W	L	T	PCT	DIV	CONF	PF	PA	STK
Jacksonville Jaguars	7	2	0	.778	2–1	6–2	269	144	W3
Houston Texans	4	6	0	.400	3–1	4–4	259	222	W1
Indianapolis Colts	3	8	0	.273	1–3	2–6	211	297	L1
Tennessee Titans	1	8	0	.111	1–2	1–6	167	239	L3

==== Conference ====
AFC
Seed	Team	Division	W	L	T	PCT	DIV	CONF	SOS	SOV	STK
**Division leaders**
1	Buffalo Bills	East	8	1	0	.889	1–1	5–1	.460	.455	W5
2 (Note: Kansas City wins tie break over Jacksonville and Cincinnati based on conference record.) (Note: Kansas City wins tie break over Denver based on division record.)	Kansas City Chiefs	West	7	2	0	.778	3–1	6–1	.391	.309	W2
3 (Note: Jacksonville wins tie break over Cincinnati based on head-to-head victory.)	Jacksonville Jaguars	South	7	2	0	.778	2–1	6–2	.448	.412	W3
4	Cincinnati Bengals	North	7	2	0	.778	2–1	5–2	.417	.333	W5
**Wild cards**
5	Denver Broncos	West	7	2	0	.778	2–1	3–1	.583	.515	W5
6	Pittsburgh Steelers	North	6	3	0	.667	2–2	3–3	.494	.431	L1
7	Cleveland Browns	North	6	4	0	.600	2–1	4–3	.430	.393	W1
**In the hunt**
8	New England Patriots	East	5	5	0	.500	3–0	5–1	.574	.447	L2
9 (Note: Houston and Las Vegas win tie break over Baltimore based on conference record.) (Note: Houston wins tie break over Las Vegas based on strength of victory.)	Houston Texans	South	4	6	0	.400	3–1	4–4	.474	.316	W1
10	Las Vegas Raiders	West	4	6	0	.400	1–1	3–3	.500	.189	L2
11	Baltimore Ravens	North	4	6	0	.400	0–2	2–5	.453	.275	L5
12	Indianapolis Colts	South	3	8	0	.273	1–3	2–6	.471	.304	L1
13	New York Jets	East	2	8	0	.200	0–3	2–5	.553	.368	L5
14 (Note: LA Chargers and Miami win tie break over Tennessee based on conference record.) (Note: LA Chargers wins tie break over Miami based on strength of victory.)	Los Angeles Chargers	West	1	8	0	.111	0–3	1–5	.563	.400	W1
15	Miami Dolphins	East	1	8	0	.111	1–1	1–5	.581	.200	L3
16	Tennessee Titans	South	1	8	0	.111	1–2	1–6	.466	.273	L3
