= Shane Steichen =

American football coach (born 1985)

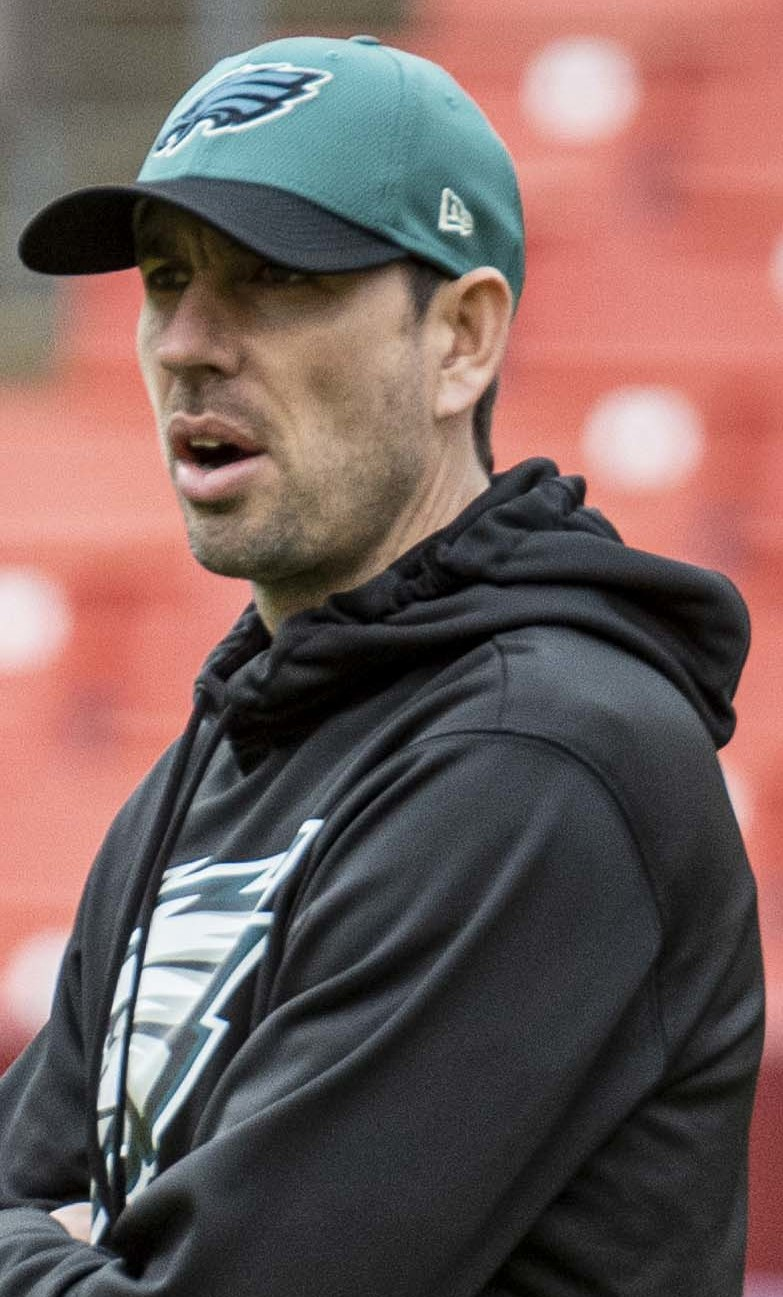
- Steichen with the Philadelphia Eagles in 2022

Indianapolis Colts
- Title: Head coach

Personal information
- Born: May 11, 1985 (age 41); Sacramento, California, U.S.
- Listed height: 6 ft 4 in (1.93 m)
- Listed weight: 205 lb (93 kg)

Career information
- Position: Quarterback
- High school: Oak Ridge (El Dorado Hills, California)
- College: UNLV (2003–2006)

Career history
- UNLV (2007–2009); Student graduate assistant (2007); Offensive graduate assistant (2008–2009); Louisville (2010) Offensive assistant; San Diego Chargers (2011–2012) Defensive assistant; Cleveland Browns (2013) Offensive quality control coach; San Diego / Los Angeles Chargers (2014–2020); Offensive quality control coach (2014–2015); Quarterbacks coach (2016–2019); Interim offensive coordinator (2019); Offensive coordinator (2020); Philadelphia Eagles (2021–2022) Offensive coordinator; Indianapolis Colts (2023–present) Head coach

Head coaching record
- Regular season: 28–33 (.459)
- Coaching profile at Pro Football Reference

Shane Steichen (/ˈstaɪkɛn/ STY-ken; born May 11, 1985) is an American professional football coach who is the head coach for the Indianapolis Colts of the National Football League (NFL). He previously served as an assistant coach for the San Diego / Los Angeles Chargers from 2014 to 2019 and their offensive coordinator in 2020, and offensive coordinator for the Philadelphia Eagles in 2021 and 2022. Steichen also served previously as an assistant coach for the Cleveland Browns in 2013.

== Playing career ==
Steichen played quarterback for Oak Ridge High School (El Dorado Hills, CA). One of his teammates was Austin Collie. In their senior years (2002), Steichen threw for 2,500 yards and 34 touchdowns to win the CIF Sac-Joaquin Section championships.

Steichen was a four-year letterman as quarterback at the University of Nevada, Las Vegas (UNLV) from 2003 to 2006. His best performance was during his senior year when he came off the bench at the end of the first quarter and tied a UNLV record by throwing five touchdown passes in regulation time in a 39–36 overtime loss to New Mexico at Sam Boyd Stadium on October 14, 2006. Steichen finished his collegiate career with 2,755 yards and 22 touchdowns to go along with 399 rushing yards and five touchdowns.

Pre-draft measurables
Height	Weight
6 ft 3 3/4 in (1.92 m)	205 lb (93 kg)
Values from Pro Day

== Coaching career ==
=== San Diego Chargers ===
In 2011, Steichen was hired by the San Diego Chargers as a defensive assistant under head coach Norv Turner. Turner's son Scott was close friends with Steichen; the pair were teammates at UNLV. Turner was fired after the 2012 season, and Steichen was not retained by new head coach Mike McCoy.

=== Cleveland Browns ===
In 2013, Steichen was hired by the Cleveland Browns as an offensive quality control coach under head coach Rob Chudzinski and new offensive coordinator Norv Turner. Despite multiple injuries at the position, the Browns had three starting quarterbacks (Jason Campbell, Brian Hoyer and Brandon Weeden) each post 300-yard passing performances for the first time in franchise history (sixth instance in NFL history). Chudzinski was fired after one season, and Steichen was not retained by new head coach Mike Pettine.

=== San Diego / Los Angeles Chargers (second stint) ===
From 2014 to 2015, Steichen served as an offensive quality control coach for the Chargers and worked primarily with the wide receivers. In 2015, Keenan Allen played in the first eight games of the season and caught 67 passes for 725 yards and four touchdowns before being placed on the team's season-ending Injured Reserve list. In 2014, San Diego had four players, including three wide receivers (Keenan Allen, Eddie Royal and Malcom Floyd), reach 50+ receptions for just the fourth time in team history.

In 2016, Steichen was promoted to quarterbacks coach. Over the next four seasons, Philip Rivers ranked second in passing yards (17,824), fourth in completions (1,446) and fourth in touchdown passes (116). He was selected to three consecutive Pro Bowls from 2016 to 2018.

In 2016, Rivers registered the second-most passing touchdowns of his career (33) while completing 349-of-578 passes for 4,386 yards.

As the league's top ranked passing offense in 2017 (276.9 yards per game), Rivers completed 360-of-575 passes for 4,515 yards with 28 touchdowns and 10 interceptions for a 96.0 passer rating.

On October 30, 2019, Steichen was promoted to interim offensive coordinator by the Los Angeles Chargers after the team fired Ken Whisenhunt. During his tenure as play caller, the unit ranked fifth in the league in total yards per game (384.3), sixth in passing yards per game (272.1) and seventh in third down percentage (42.7 percent).

In 2020, Steichen was promoted to full-time offensive coordinator. Steichen worked with quarterback Justin Herbert, whom the team selected with the sixth overall pick of the 2020 NFL Draft. The 2020 Associated Press Offensive Rookie of the Year completed 396-of-595 passes for 4,336 yards with 31 touchdowns with 10 interceptions for a 98.3 passer rating. Herbert set NFL rookie records in completions and passing touchdowns, while registering the second-most passing yards by a rookie in league history (Andrew Luck – 4,374). He finished in the top 10 in the league in completions (fourth), passing yards (sixth) and passing touchdowns (10th). Additionally, wide receiver Keenan Allen caught 100 passes for 992 yards and eight touchdowns en route to Pro Bowl honors.

In Steichen's first full season as the Chargers' offensive coordinator, Los Angeles finished in the top 10 in yards per game (382.1 – ninth), passing yards per game (270.6 – sixth), first downs per game (23.3 – sixth), third down percentage (44.2 percent – ninth) and fewest turnovers (16 – tied-fourth).

=== Philadelphia Eagles ===
==== 2021 season ====
On January 25, 2021, Steichen was hired by the Philadelphia Eagles as their offensive coordinator under head coach Nick Sirianni. Steichen was instrumental in the development of quarterback Jalen Hurts, who completed 265-of-432 passes for 3,144 yards, 16 touchdowns, and nine interceptions for an 87.2 passer rating in his first season as a starter. Hurts also rushed for 784 yards and 10 touchdowns. He became just the eighth quarterback in NFL history to register 3,000 passing yards and 750 rushing yards in a season. Hurts also became the youngest Eagles quarterback to ever start in a playoff game.

DeVonta Smith, whom the team selected with the 10th overall pick of the 2021 NFL Draft, registered 64 receptions for 916 yards and five touchdowns while setting the franchise rookie record in receiving yards. Tight end Dallas Goedert totaled 56 receptions for 830 yards and four touchdowns, which was a single-season career high and ranked fifth in the league among tight ends. Steichen also helped Jason Kelce (First Team) and Lane Johnson (Second Team) each earn Associated Press All-Pro recognition. Kelce was also selected to the Pro Bowl.

In his first season in Philadelphia, Steichen orchestrated the NFL's most productive rushing offense, as the Eagles led the league with a franchise-record 2,715 rushing yards. Philadelphia ranked fourth in third down percentage (then-team-record 45.7 percent), eighth in red zone percentage (62.3 percent) and fifth in fewest turnovers (16).

==== 2022 season ====
In 2022, Steichen guided a Philadelphia offense that finished in the top 10 in numerous categories, including yards per game (389.1 – third), points per game (28.1 – third), rushing yards per game (147.6 – fifth), passing yards per game (241.5 – ninth), fewest turnovers (19 – tied-fifth), first downs per game (22.6 – third), third down percentage (franchise-record 45.95 percent – fourth), fourth down percentage (68.75 percent – fourth), red zone percentage (67.80 percent – third), goal to go percentage (82.35 percent – fifth), points scored on their first offensive possession (62 – first) and plays of 10+ yards (253 – second). The Eagles were one of just two teams to finish in the top 10 in rushing yards per game and passing yards per game. Jalen Hurts set single-season career highs in every passing category, including completions (306), passing yards (3,701), passing touchdowns (22), completion percentage (66.5) and passer rating (101.5). He also had a team high and single-season career-high 13 rushing touchdowns while finishing fourth in the NFL in passer rating and 10th in passing yards.

Philadelphia was one of just two teams to have two 1,000-yard receivers (A. J. Brown and DeVonta Smith) as well as a 1,000-yard rusher (Miles Sanders). In his first season with Philadelphia, Brown established single-season career highs in receptions (88) and receiving yards (1,496), while tying his single-season career high in receiving touchdowns (11). Smith also had a career year as he caught 95 passes for 1,196 yards and seven touchdowns (all single-season career highs). Brown (fourth) and Smith (ninth) each ranked in the top 10 in receiving yards and Brown tied for third in receiving touchdowns. Sanders finished fifth in the league in rushing after registering 259 carries for 1,269 yards (4.9 avg.) and 11 touchdowns (all single-season career highs).

The Eagles led the NFL with eight total Pro Bowl selections in 2022, which included six on offense in A. J. Brown, Landon Dickerson, Jalen Hurts, Lane Johnson, Jason Kelce and Miles Sanders. Additionally, Lane Johnson (First Team), Jason Kelce (First Team), A. J. Brown (Second Team) and Jalen Hurts (Second Team) each earned Associated Press All-Pro honors.

The Eagles would go on to lose 38–35 to the Kansas City Chiefs in Super Bowl LVII, with Steichen leading the offense to put up 427 total yards and four touchdowns.

During his two seasons as offensive coordinator, Steichen coordinated an offense that ranked first in the NFL in rushing yards per game (153.6), rushing yards (5,224) and rushing touchdowns (57) over that time frame. Philadelphia also ranked tied for first in fewest interceptions (19) and third in fourth down conversion percentage (58.92 percent). Additionally, the Eagles offense set new single-season franchise records in third down conversion percentage in back-to-back seasons.

=== Indianapolis Colts ===
On February 14, 2023, Steichen was hired by the Indianapolis Colts as their head coach.

==== 2023 season ====
Steichen won in his second preseason game 24–17 against the Chicago Bears on August 19, 2023. However, the Colts lost in Steichen's regular season debut against the Jacksonville Jaguars by a score of 31–21 on September 10, 2023. The following week, Steichen won his first regular-season game against the Houston Texans by a score of 31–20. Steichen oversaw the development of rookie quarterback Anthony Richardson, who drew comparisons coming out of college physically to Steichen's former quarterback Jalen Hurts, before Richardson suffered a season ending shoulder injury in Week 5. From that point on, with Gardner Minshew running the offense, Steichen brought the Colts within one game of a playoff berth, which they ultimately fell short of with a season-ending loss to the Texans during the regular season finale.

In Steichen's first year as head coach, the team's offense improved across many metrics, including points per game, yards per game, and total offensive touchdowns, despite key injuries to Richardson and running back Jonathan Taylor.

==== 2024 season ====
In the 2024 season, Steichen led the Colts to a 8–9 record, which did not qualify for the postseason. After a tumultuous season which included quarterback controversy, defensive struggles, and sluggish offensive production, Steichen entered the end of the season on a relatively short leash and uncertainty of his future. The day after the 26–23 overtime season finale victory against the Jacksonville Jaguars, owner Jim Irsay announced his intention to retain both Steichen and general manager Chris Ballard.

==== 2025 season ====
In 2025, Steichen returned as head coach for his third season. Steichen and the Colts brought in former New York Giants quarterback Daniel Jones, who won the starting position over Anthony Richardson. Jones and Steichen saw a vast and historic improvement in offensive performance in 2025, fielding the most offensive points in the first eight games of the year since the 2009 season. Steichen and the Colts' 7–1 start is their best since their 2009. However, after the hot start, the Colts went 1–7 over their next eight games, during which Jones sustained several injuries and was ruled out for the season. After the season ended, Colts CEO and co-owner Carlie Irsay-Gordon announced that Steichen would remain the team's head coach going into the 2026 season.

==== 2026 season ====
During Week 2 on the road against the Chiefs on Sunday Night Football, Steichen received immense criticism for his play calling toward the end of the game. Down 30–27 in overtime, the Colts possessed the ball at the Chiefs' 17-yard line. Although a touchdown would win the game, Steichen chose to run the ball with Taylor on first and second down, both resulting in a loss of yards. On third down, Jones scrambled and was tackled eight yards short of the line to gain. Steichen settled for the field goal on fourth and eight. Kansas City got the ball back and won the game on their own field goal. Steichen defended his calls as wanting Taylor to score the winning touchdown.

== Career statistics ==
=== College ===
Season	Team	Games			Passing								Rushing			
Season	Team	GP	GS	Record	Cmp	Att	Pct	Yds	Y/A	TD	Int	Rtg	Att	Yds	Avg	TD
2003	UNLV	3	2	1–1	17	38	44.7	215	5.7	0	1	87.0	6	–39	–6.5	0
2004	UNLV	9	5	0–5	92	187	49.2	1,011	5.4	7	10	96.3	20	2	0.1	2
2005	UNLV	5	5	1–4	88	159	55.3	967	6.1	8	5	116.7	67	324	4.8	3
2006	UNLV	6	1	0–1	47	81	58.0	562	6.9	7	4	134.9	34	112	3.3	0
Career		23	13	2–11	244	465	52.5	2,755	5.9	22	20	109.3	127	399	3.1	5

== Head coaching record ==
Team	Year	Regular season					Postseason			
Team	Year	Won	Lost	Ties	Win %	Finish	Won	Lost	Win %	Result
IND	2023	9	8	0	.529	3rd in AFC South	—	—	—	—
IND	2024	8	9	0	.471	2nd in AFC South	—	—	—	—
IND	2025	8	9	0	.471	3rd in AFC South	—	—	—	—
IND	2026	3	8	0	.273	TBD in AFC South	—	—	—	—
Total		28	32	0	.467	—	—	—	—	—

== Personal life ==
A native of Sacramento, California, Steichen earned his degree in journalism and media studies from UNLV. He attended Oak Ridge High School in El Dorado Hills, California, and earned area MVP honors from the Sacramento Bee after leading his squad to a conference sectional title in 2002. Shortly after graduation, Steichen appeared on contestants' row in a 2003 episode of The Price Is Right but never made it on stage, telling former Eagle Jason Kelce that he was supposed to bid last in a "One Bid" segment but Bob Barker made him go before another contestant, who bid $1 higher than Steichen and was the closest to the actual retail price.

Steichen and his wife, Nina, have two children: Hudson and Stella. Steichen's older brother, Sean, was a punter at Boise State.
