= Daniel Jones (American football) =

American football player (born 1997)

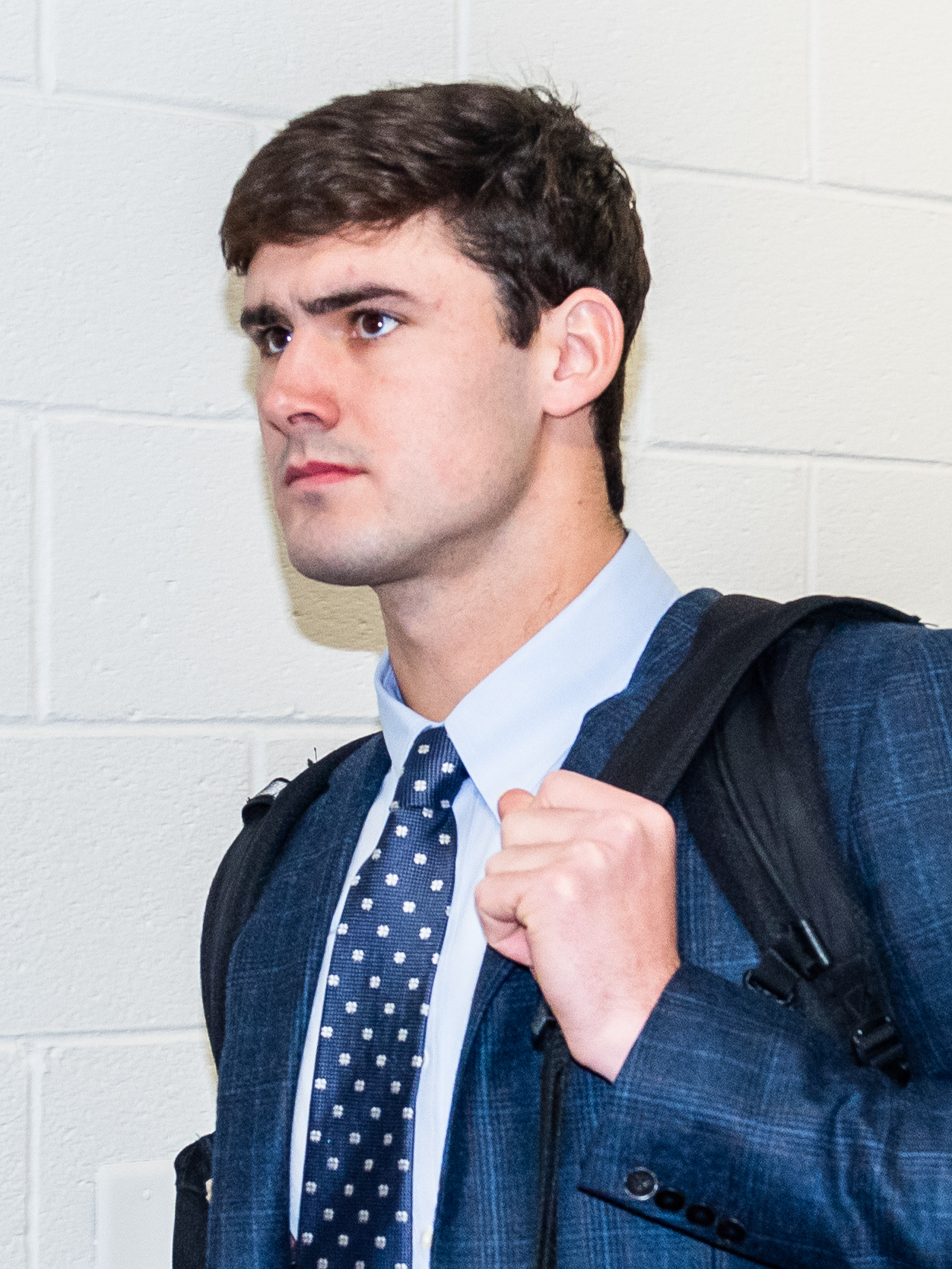
- Jones in 2019

Profile
- Position: Quarterback

Personal information
- Born: May 27, 1997 (age 29); Charlotte, North Carolina, U.S.
- Listed height: 6 ft 5 in (1.96 m)
- Listed weight: 230 lb (104 kg)

Career information
- High school: Charlotte Latin School
- College: Duke (2015–2018)
- NFL draft: 2019: 1st round, 6th overall pick

Career history
- New York Giants (2019–2024); Minnesota Vikings (2024); Indianapolis Colts (2025–2026)

Career NFL statistics as of 2026
- Passing attempts: 2,976
- Passing completions: 1,903
- Completion percentage: 63.9%
- TD–INT: 96–68
- Passing yards: 19,657
- Passer rating: 84.1
- Rushing yards: 2,441
- Rushing touchdowns: 21
- Stats at Pro Football Reference

Daniel Stephen Jones III (born May 27, 1997), nicknamed "Danny Dimes" and "Indiana Jones", is an American professional football quarterback. He played college football for the Duke Blue Devils and was selected sixth overall by the New York Giants in the 2019 NFL draft.

In 2022, Jones' fourth season, the Giants made their first playoff appearance since 2016 and won their first playoff game since 2011. The following offseason, he signed a 4-year, $160 million extension with the team. Jones was benched midway through the 2024 season and was subsequently released after nearly six seasons with the Giants. He then joined the Minnesota Vikings in 2024, where he spent the rest of the season as a backup.

Following the 2024 season, Jones signed a one-year deal with the Indianapolis Colts, where he beat out Anthony Richardson for the starting job and was considered an MVP candidate until an injury in December 2025. He later signed an $88,000,000 contract with the Colts in March 2026, the largest two-year extension in the history of the league at the time. Poor play and a 3–8 record led to his release 11 games into the 2026 season.

== Early life ==
Jones was born in Charlotte, North Carolina, on May 27, 1997. He is the oldest son of Becca and Steve Jones.

Jones attended Charlotte Latin School in Charlotte, North Carolina. During his high school career, he had 6,997 passing yards and 98 touchdowns. Despite these numbers, Jones was barely recruited coming out of high school and was not ranked by Rivals.com.

Jones originally committed to Princeton University to play college football, but then opted to become a walk-on at Duke University.

== College career ==
=== 2016 ===
After redshirting his first year at Duke in 2015, Jones became the starting quarterback in his sophomore season in 2016 after quarterback Thomas Sirk suffered a season-ending injury. Jones started all 12 games, completing 270 of 430 passes (62.8%) for 2,836 yards, sixteen touchdowns and nine interceptions.

=== 2017 ===
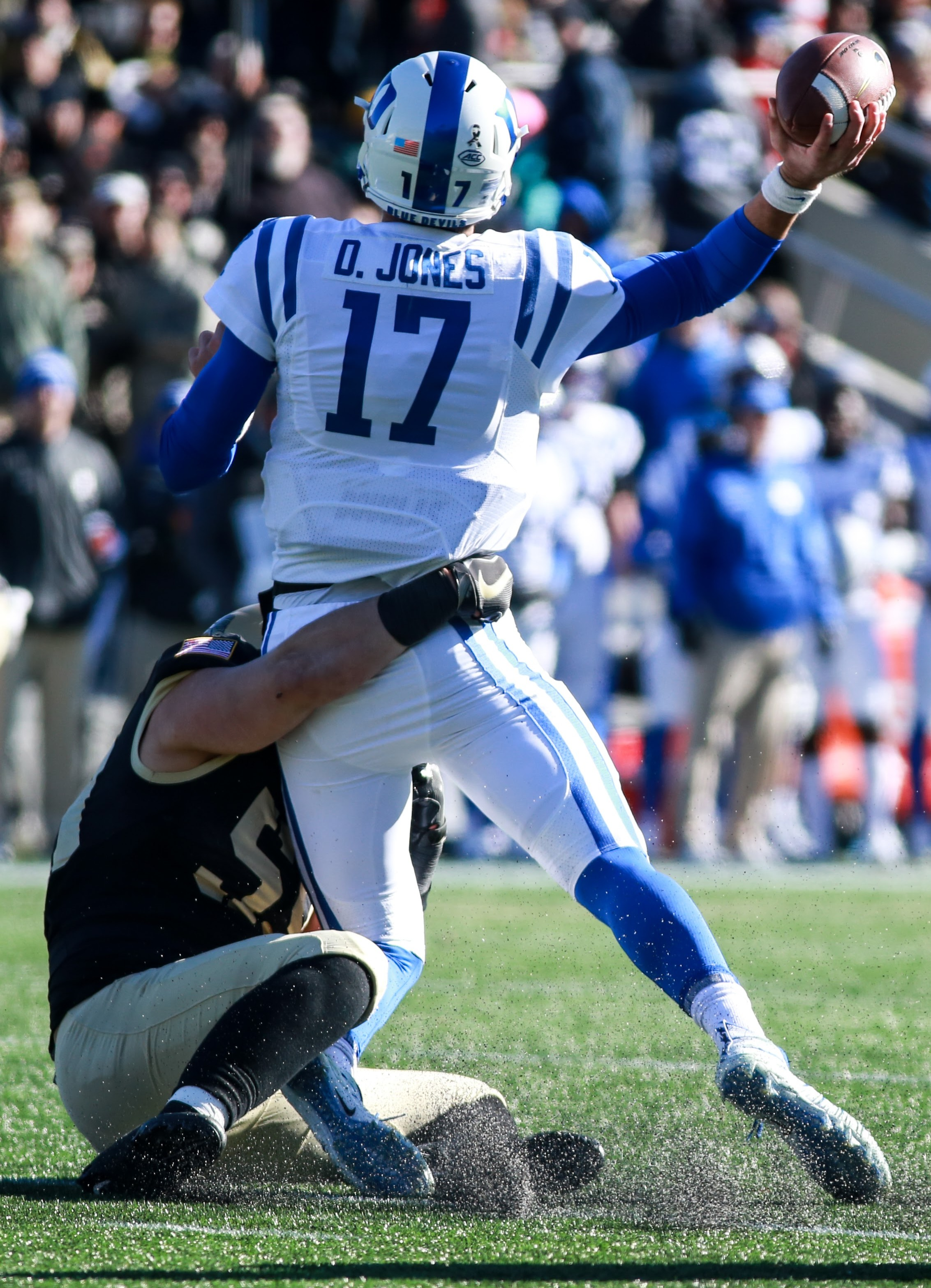
Jones with Duke in 2017

In 2017, he completed 230 of 413 passes (55.7%) for 2,439 yards, 14 touchdowns and 11 interceptions as a junior. Jones was named MVP of the 2017 Quick Lane Bowl against Northern Illinois where he went 27-of-40 with 252 passing yards and two touchdowns, along with 86 rushing yards from sixteen carries for one touchdown.

=== 2018 ===
During his senior year, Jones was named the MVP in the 2018 Independence Bowl, where he went 30–41 with 423 passing yards and five touchdowns in a 56–27 victory over Temple. He later played in the 2019 Senior Bowl for the North team, and was also the MVP of that game, going 8-of-11 with 115 passing yards and one touchdown.

Jones graduated from Duke in December 2018 with a degree in economics.

== Professional career ==
Pre-draft measurables
Height	Weight	Arm length	Hand span	Wingspan	40-yard dash	10-yard split	20-yard split	20-yard shuttle	Three-cone drill	Vertical jump	Broad jump	Wonderlic
6 ft 5 1/8 in (1.96 m)	221 lb (100 kg)	32 1/2 in (0.83 m)	9 3/4 in (0.25 m)	6 ft 6 1/8 in (1.98 m)	4.72 s	1.62 s	2.63 s	4.41 s	7.00 s	33.5 in (0.85 m)	10 ft 0 in (3.05 m)	37
All values from NFL Combine/Pro Day

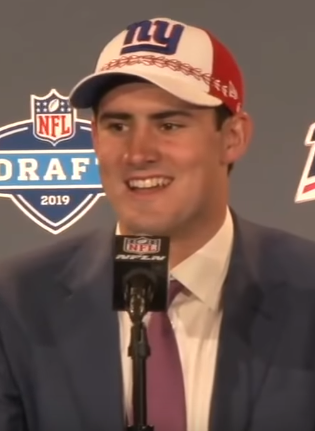
Jones at the 2019 NFL draft

=== New York Giants ===
==== 2019 ====
Jones was drafted by the New York Giants in the first round with the sixth overall pick in the 2019 NFL draft. On July 22, 2019, Jones signed his four-year rookie contract, worth $25.664 million, including a $16.7 million signing bonus.

Despite a stellar preseason, Jones was named the backup behind Eli Manning. Jones played his first regular season game on September 8 against the Dallas Cowboys in relief of Manning, where he completed 3-of-4 passes for 17 yards and lost a fumble as the Giants lost 35–17. On September 17, after an 0–2 start to the season, head coach Pat Shurmur named Jones the starter over Manning for their Week 3 matchup against the Tampa Bay Buccaneers. In his first NFL career start, Jones completed 23-of-36 pass attempts for 336 yards with a 112.7 passer rating and two passing touchdowns, along with 28 rushing yards and two rushing touchdowns, in a 32–31 comeback win against the Buccaneers, despite losing two fumbles. He became the first Giants' rookie quarterback to win his first career start since Scott Brunner in 1980. Jones was able to lead the Giants back from an 18-point deficit to beat the Buccaneers and became the seventh rookie quarterback since 2010 to have a game-winning drive in their first career start. He was also named NFC Offensive Player of the Week for his performance.

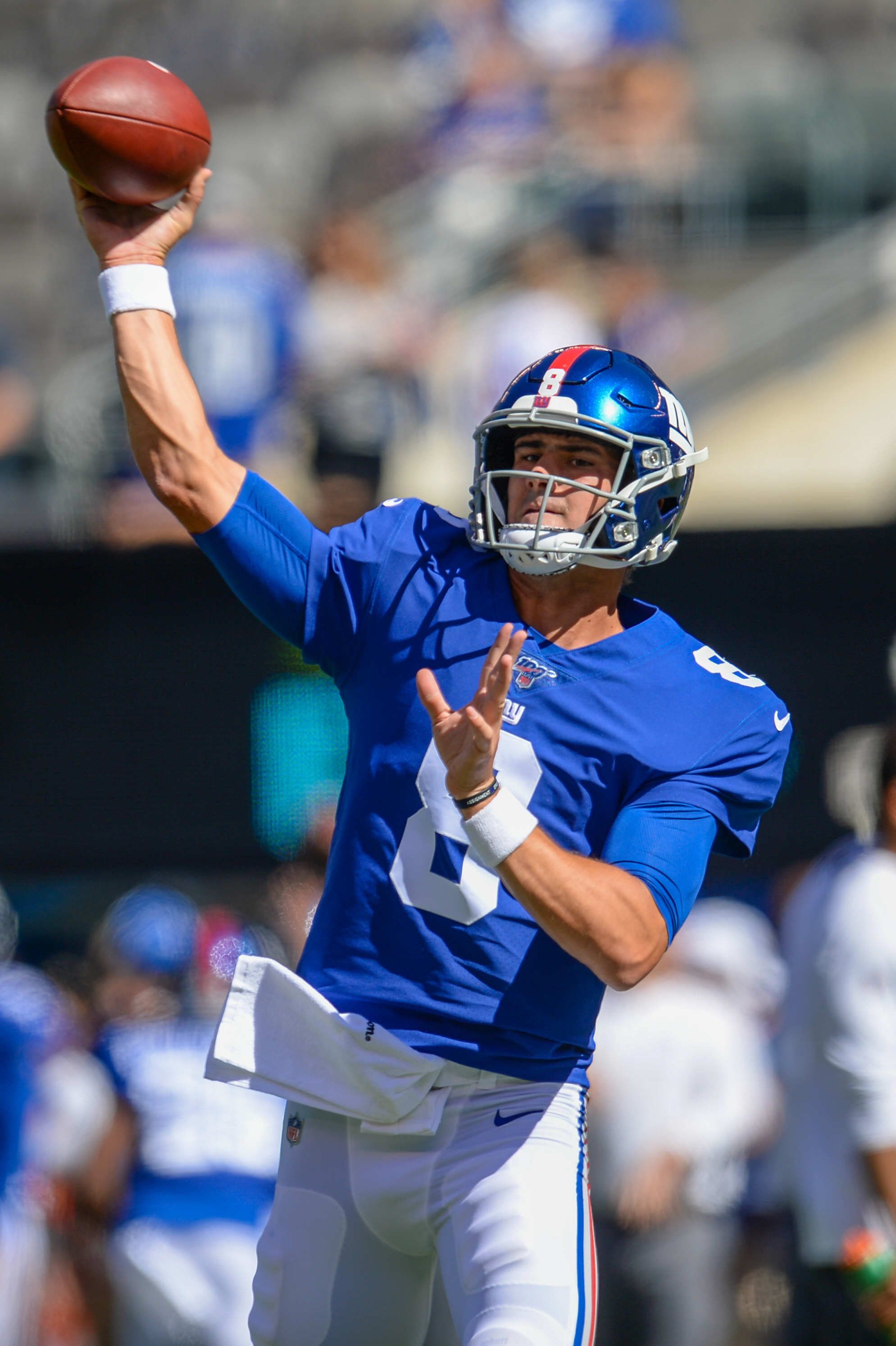
Jones throwing a pass against the Washington Redskins in 2019

On September 29, in his second career start (and first career start at home), Jones led the Giants to a 24–3 victory over the Washington Redskins. After the game, Jones became the third quarterback in the Giants' history after Phil Simms (1979) and Travis Tidwell (1950) to begin their career with two wins as a starting quarterback for the franchise.

Jones played his first game on prime time on Thursday Night Football in Week 6 against the New England Patriots. In the game, Jones threw for 161 yards, one touchdown, and three interceptions in the 35–14 loss. In Week 8 against the Detroit Lions, he threw for 322 passing yards and four passing touchdowns in a 31–26 defeat. In Week 10 against the New York Jets, Jones threw for 308 yards and four touchdowns in the 34–27 loss. In Week 13 against the Green Bay Packers, Jones suffered an ankle injury, but insisted on playing through. He threw for one touchdown and three interceptions in the 31–13 loss. At 2–10 for the season and Jones suffering an ankle sprain, Manning was made starter for the next two games as the former recovered. In Jones' return in Week 16, he threw for a career-high 352 passing yards and (career-high) five passing touchdowns as the Giants defeated the Redskins in overtime 41–35. In the process, Jones became the fifth rookie quarterback in NFL history to throw five touchdown passes in a game. He also became the only rookie quarterback in NFL history to throw for 350 passing yards with five touchdowns and zero interceptions in a single game. He was named the Pepsi Offensive Rookie of the Week for his efforts. In Week 17 against the Philadelphia Eagles, Jones threw for 301 yards, one touchdown, and one interception during the 34–17 loss. Jones finished his rookie season with 3,027 passing yards, 24 passing touchdowns and 12 interceptions, to go along with 45 carries for 279 rushing yards, two rushing touchdowns, and a league-leading 18 fumbles with 11 lost.

==== 2020 ====
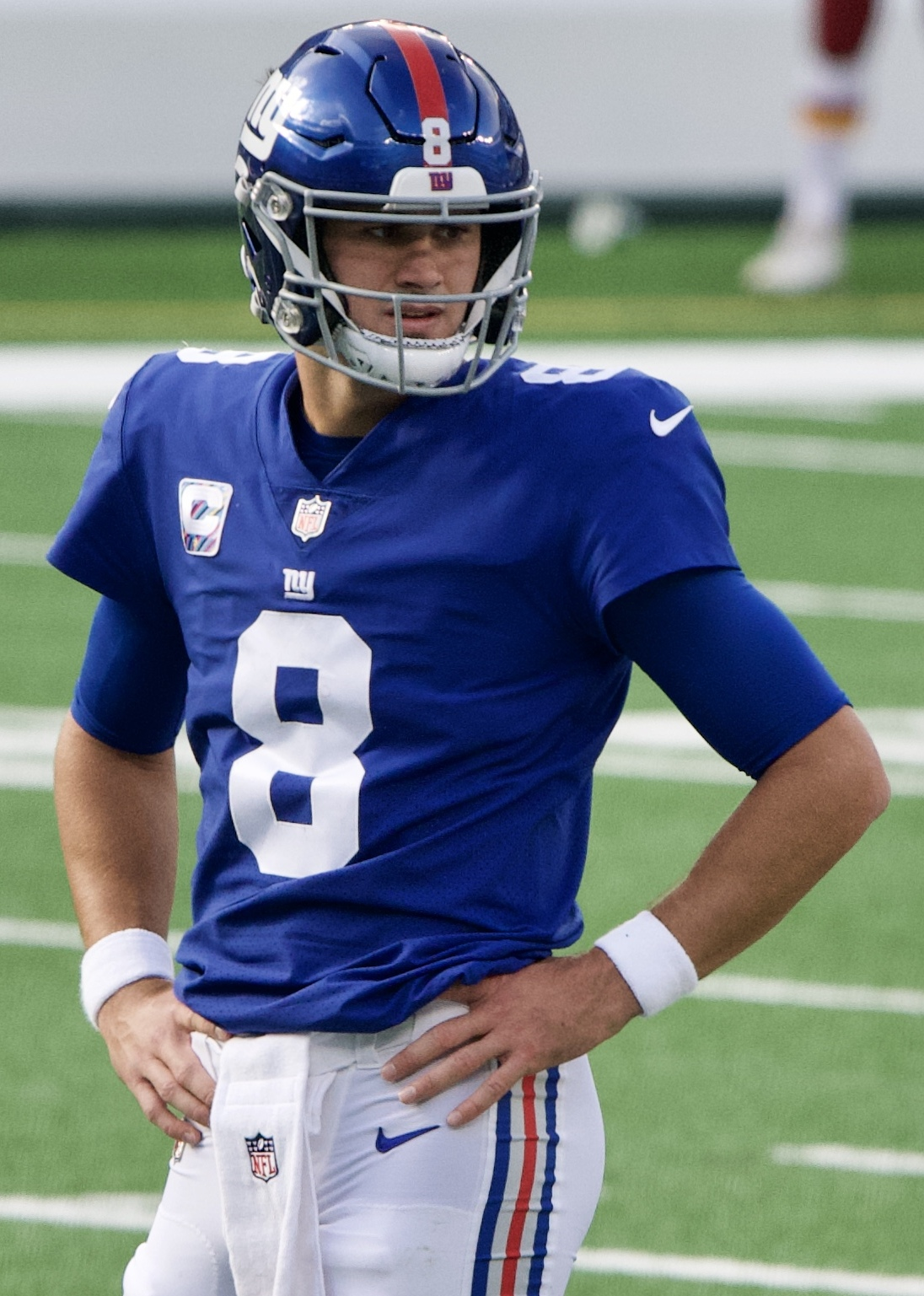
Jones in 2020

After Eli Manning retired, Jones was selected to be a team captain in his second season. It was the fourteenth consecutive season that the Giants' starting quarterback had served as a captain. Manning had held the honor for the previous thirteen years.

During Week 7 against the Philadelphia Eagles, in the third quarter, Jones ran for an impressive 80 yards on a single play, before losing his balance and tripping on the turf near the endzone. Despite the trip, this rush became the longest run in Giants' quarterback history. Jones hit a top speed of 21.23 mph (34.17 km/h), the fastest by an NFL quarterback since 2018 (Lamar Jackson). In Week 10 against Philadelphia, Jones threw for 244 yards and rushed for 64 yards, including a 34-yard rushing touchdown, during the 27–17 win.

Jones injured his hamstring in the third quarter of Week 12 against the Cincinnati Bengals, causing him to miss the rest of the game and the following game against the Seattle Seahawks. After suffering an ankle injury against the Arizona Cardinals in Week 14, he missed the following game against the Cleveland Browns.

In Week 17, in a game against the Cowboys, Jones had one of his best performances of his young career, completing 17-of-25 passes for 229 yards, 2 touchdowns, and an interception in a 23–19 win. Jones also helped drive the Giants down the field to set up a jet sweep touchdown to Sterling Shepard. Additionally, this was the first time that the Giants had beat the Cowboys since the 2016 season, and helped the Giants finish with their best record since that season. The Giants finished the season at 6–10, and missed the playoffs for the fourth consecutive year after the Washington Football Team beat the Eagles later that day.

==== 2021 ====
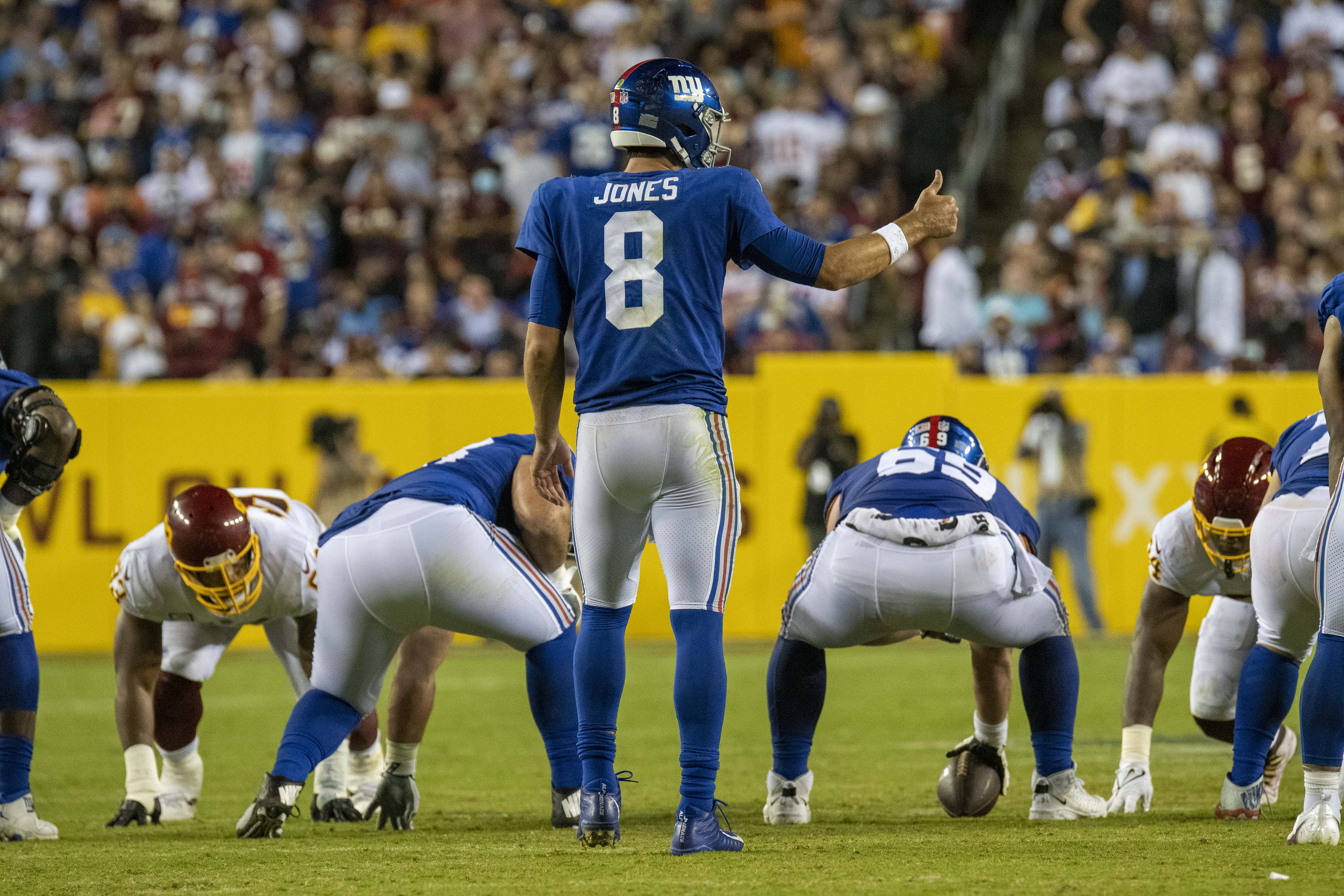
Jones against the Washington Football Team in 2021

Jones began the 2021 season throwing for 267 yards, one touchdown, rushing for 27 yards and an additional touchdown, and fumbled once in a 27–13 loss to the Denver Broncos. Against the Washington Football Team on Thursday Night Football, Jones threw for 249 yards, rushed for 95 yards, and had two touchdowns, but miscues by the Giants would cost them a pair of touchdowns as the Giants lost 29–30. Against the New Orleans Saints, Jones threw for a career-high 402 yards, two touchdowns, and an interception as the Giants won 27–21 in overtime. As a result of his performance, Jones was named NFC Offensive Player of the Week. In Week 7 against the Carolina Panthers, Jones threw for 203 yards, one touchdown, zero interceptions, rushing for 28 yards, and recorded his first career reception thrown by wide receiver Dante Pettis for 16 yards, in the 25–3 win.

In Week 12 against the Eagles, Jones suffered a neck injury, causing him to miss the remainder of the season. On December 20, 2021, Jones was placed on injured reserve. Jones finished his 2021 season with 2,428 passing yards, 10 passing touchdowns, and 7 interceptions to go along with 62 carries for 298 rushing yards and two rushing touchdowns.

==== 2022 ====
In April 2022, the Giants declined Jones's fifth-year option for 2023.

In the season opener against the Tennessee Titans, Jones threw for 188 yards, two touchdowns, and an interception in the 21–20 comeback win. In Week 5 against the Green Bay Packers in London, Jones completed 21-of-27 pass attempts, throwing for 217 yards, and rushed for 37 yards with 10 carries in a 27–22 upset. In Week 7 against the Jacksonville Jaguars, Jones threw for 202 yards and a touchdown, and rushed for 107 yards, becoming the first Giants' quarterback to record 100+ rushing yards in a game since Frank Filchock in 1946 in the 23–17 win. As a result of his performance, Jones was named NFC Offensive Player of the Week.

In Week 16 against the Minnesota Vikings, Jones threw for 334 yards, a touchdown, and an interception in the 27–24 loss. The next week against the Indianapolis Colts, Jones threw for 177 yards, two touchdowns, and rushed for 91 yards and two touchdowns in the 38–10 win, helping the Giants clinch a playoff berth for the first time since 2016. Jones finished the regular season with 3,205 passing yards, 15 passing touchdowns and five interceptions to go along with 120 carries for 708 rushing yards and seven rushing touchdowns.

After winning the Wild Card Round against the Vikings 31–24, Jones made NFL history by becoming the first player ever with 300+ passing yards, 2+ touchdown passes, and 70+ rushing yards in a playoff game. The Giants saw their first playoff win since 2011. However, the team saw their season end in the Divisional Round, a 38–7 loss to the Eagles; Jones threw for 135 yards and one interception.

==== 2023 ====
On March 7, 2023, Jones signed a four-year, $160 million contract extension with the Giants. In Week 5, he sustained a neck injury in a loss to the Miami Dolphins and was relieved by Tyrod Taylor. Taylor was named starter for Weeks 6 through 8, who was also injured and replaced by Tommy DeVito in Week 8. Having missed three games, he returned in Week 9 against the Las Vegas Raiders; however, he injured his knee in the first quarter, before leaving the game early in the second quarter after it buckled as he dropped back. DeVito finished out the game in place of Jones. The following day, the Giants ruled Jones out for the season with a torn ACL in his right knee. Jones finished his 2023 campaign with 909 passing yards, two touchdowns, six interceptions, and a 1–5 record.

==== 2024 ====
Returning from his injury the previous season, Jones was once again named the Giants' starting quarterback. In his first start since November 5, 2023, Jones led the team to a Week 1 home loss to the Minnesota Vikings in which Jones completed 22-of-42 passes for one of the worst completion percentages of his career with 52.4%. He also threw zero touchdowns and two interceptions, both of which led to Vikings' touchdown drives as the Giants lost 28–6. In a Week 2 loss to the Washington Commanders, Jones threw his first touchdown pass of the season on a four-yard pass to wide receiver Malik Nabers. He finished the game completing 57% of his passes (16-of-28) for 178 yards, two touchdowns and zero turnovers. Week 3 saw Jones lead the Giants to their first win of the season, completing 24-of-34 passes for 236 yards and two touchdowns in a 21–15 victory over the Cleveland Browns.

In Week 9 against the Commanders, Jones threw his first touchdown pass at MetLife Stadium in 672 days as the Giants lost 27–22. The following week, Jones and the Giants traveled to Munich, Germany, to play in the NFL International Series against the Carolina Panthers. Jones threw for 190 yards and two interceptions, only scoring a two-yard rushing touchdown as the Giants lost in overtime. With the Giants' defeat in Germany, Jones had led the team to five straight losses heading into their Week 11 bye. Through the first ten weeks, Jones threw just eight touchdown passes against seven interceptions for 2,070 yards.

On November 18, 2024, during the Giants’ bye week, Jones was benched in favor of Tommy DeVito due to his poor performance. On November 22, Jones asked to be released by the Giants, a request granted by owner and president John Mara. In a statement confirming his decision, Mara said, “We hold Daniel in high regard and have a great appreciation for him. We wish him nothing but the best in the future.” Jones concluded his six-year tenure in New York with a 24–44–1 record as a starter, the lowest winning percentage among quarterbacks with at least 50 starts since 2019. He also recorded the lowest touchdown percentage (3.1%) among quarterbacks with at least 1,000 pass attempts in that span.

=== Minnesota Vikings ===
On November 29, 2024, Jones was signed onto the Minnesota Vikings' practice squad after clearing waivers several days prior. Jones remained on the practice squad throughout December as he continued to learn the playbook, though the Vikings also looked at him as a potential option if starter Sam Darnold left the team in 2025.

He was promoted to the active roster on January 7, 2025, with Brett Rypien being waived to make room for Jones. Jones was the emergency quarterback behind Darnold and Nick Mullens for the Vikings' Wild Card game against the Los Angeles Rams.

=== Indianapolis Colts ===
==== 2025 ====
On March 13, 2025, Jones signed with the Indianapolis Colts on a one-year, $14 million contract. His signing came after comments by general manager Chris Ballard saying that there will be an "open competition" with Anthony Richardson to determine the Colts' starting quarterback for the 2025 season. On August 19, Jones was named the starting quarterback for the 2025 season.

In his Colts debut against the Miami Dolphins, Jones completed 22 of his 29 passes for 272 yards and a touchdown, as well as two rushing touchdowns to guide the team to their first Week 1 victory since 2013. In the Week 2 win against the Denver Broncos, Jones completed 23 of 34 passes for 316 yards, accompanied by a lone touchdown pass to Jonathan Taylor. Against division rivals Tennessee Titans, Jones completed 18 of 25 passes for 228 yards and a touchdown. Jones helped lead the Colts to a 3–0 start on the season, their first since 2009. Jones suffered his first loss as the Colts' starting quarterback in Week 4 against the Los Angeles Rams, where he and the team came up short 27–20. Despite throwing for 262 yards and a touchdown, Jones would throw 2 interceptions, both to Rams safety Kam Curl, the latter of which occurred within the final minute of the game on what would have been a potential scoring drive, sealing the win for the Rams. The Jones-led Colts were the first team in NFL history to score on their first 10 possessions of the season, and their 103 points through the first three games are the most to start a season in franchise history. Due to Jones' newfound success as a starter for the Colts, fans began to dub him "Indiana Jones", a play on Jones' surname and his team's location, and a reference to the titular action movie character of the same name. While initially indifferent to the moniker, Jones subsequently joked it was a "nickname upgrade" from his New York Giants nickname "Daniel Dimes".

During the first quarter of a game against the Jacksonville Jaguars on December 7, 2025, Jones dropped back in the pocket to pass; after releasing the pass, he fell to the ground clutching his right calf; he was ruled out the rest of the game with an Achilles tendon injury. The next day, Colts head coach Shane Steichen confirmed Jones had torn his Achilles tendon and would miss the remainder of the season. He was placed on injured reserve on December 9.

==== 2026 ====
On March 3, 2026, the Colts placed the transition tag on Jones. On March 12, he signed a two-year, $88 million contract extension with the team.

Jones began the season with a 41–23 loss to the Baltimore Ravens, throwing a touchdown against an interception while being pressured on a league-high 52.9 percent of his dropbacks. The following week against the Chiefs, in overtime, he completed a 48-yard pass to Laquon Treadwell to put the Colts in the red zone; rather than attempt to score the touchdown, the offense switched to a conservative approach afterward that resulted in a field goal before Kansas City kicked the game winner on their ensuing drive. He scored his first rushing touchdown of the season in Week 4's 30–13 win over the Commanders on a four-yard run.

After starting 2–2, the Colts endured a five-game losing streak. Jones struggled during this stretch, including throwing two interceptions apiece in losses to the Titans and Jaguars. He was also benched in favor of Richardson during the latter's 42–7 loss. The slide ended with a 24–22 victory in Week 10 against the Dolphins, though Jones was intercepted twice again with one being returned for a touchdown.

The slump led to several midseason changes by the Colts, such as firing general manager Chris Ballard and trading away several players at the trade deadline. Teams also inquired about trading for Jones, but were rebuked by the Colts. Jones said he was "not happy to see" the departures, but it was "outside of our control". The trades resulted in a depleted receiver corps for Jones to work with, and the offense continued to flounder while being routinely booed during Week 10.

In Week 11, Jones completed just 44 percent of his passes with an interception as the Colts fell 26–3 to the Houston Texans. He was replaced by Richardson in the fourth quarter.

On November 20, the day after the game, the Colts released Jones. In his final season with the Colts, Jones became the first quarterback in 45 years to start in each of his team's first 11 games of a season without recording a single game where he had more passing touchdowns than interceptions.

== Career statistics ==
Legend
	Led the league
**Bold**	Career high

=== NFL ===
==== Regular season ====
Year	Team	Games			Passing									Rushing					Sacked		Fumbles	
Year	Team	GP	GS	Record	Cmp	Att	Pct	Yds	Y/A	Lng	TD	Int	Rtg	Att	Yds	Y/A	Lng	TD	Sck	SckY	Fum	Lost
2019	NYG	13	12	3−9	284	459	61.9	3,027	6.6	**75**	**24**	12	87.7	45	279	6.2	26	2	38	**295**	**19**	**11**
2020	NYG	14	14	5−9	280	448	62.5	2,943	6.6	53	11	10	80.4	65	423	**6.5**	**80**	1	**45**	286	10	6
2021	NYG	11	11	4−7	232	361	64.3	2,428	6.7	54	10	7	84.8	62	298	4.8	46	2	22	160	7	3
2022	NYG	16	16	9−6−1	**317**	**472**	67.2	**3,205**	6.8	65	15	5	92.5	**120**	**708**	5.9	25	**7**	44	243	6	3
2023	NYG	6	6	1−5	108	160	67.5	909	5.7	58	2	6	70.5	40	206	5.2	17	1	30	167	4	1
2024	NYG	10	10	2−8	216	341	63.3	2,070	6.1	43	8	7	79.4	67	265	4.0	24	2	29	172	4	2
2025	IND	13	13	**8–5**	261	384	**68.0**	3,101	**8.1**	**75**	19	8	**100.2**	45	164	3.6	19	5	22	158	9	3
2026	IND	11	11	3–8	205	351	58.4	1,974	5.6	48	7	**13**	65.4	34	98	2.9	17	1	27	176	5	2
Career		94	93	35−57−1	1,903	2,976	63.9	19,657	6.6	75	96	68	84.1	478	2,441	5.1	80	21	257	1,657	64	31

==== Postseason ====
Year	Team	Games			Passing									Rushing					Sacked		Fumbles	
Year	Team	GP	GS	Record	Cmp	Att	Pct	Yds	Y/A	Lng	TD	Int	Rtg	Att	Yds	Y/A	Lng	TD	Sck	SckY	Fum	Lost
2022	NYG	2	2	1−1	39	62	62.9	436	7.0	47	2	1	87.8	23	102	4.4	15	0	8	38	1	0
Career		2	2	1−1	39	62	62.9	436	7.0	47	2	1	87.8	23	102	4.4	15	0	8	38	1	0

=== College ===
Season	Team	Games			Passing									Rushing			
Season	Team	GP	GS	Record	Cmp	Att	Pct	Yds	Avg	AY/A	TD	Int	Rtg	Att	Yds	Avg	TD
2015	Duke	0	0	—	Redshirt												
2016	Duke	12	12	4–8	**270**	430	**62.8**	**2,836**	6.6	6.4	16	9	126.3	141	486	**3.4**	**7**
2017	Duke	13	13	**7–6**	257	**453**	56.7	2,691	5.9	5.5	14	**11**	112.0	**161**	**518**	3.2	**7**
2018	Duke	11	11	6–5	237	392	60.5	2,674	**6.8**	**6.9**	**22**	9	**131.7**	104	319	3.1	3
Career		36	36	17–19	764	1,275	59.9	8,201	6.4	6.2	52	29	122.9	406	1,323	3.3	17

== Records ==
=== Giants franchise records ===
- Most games started (rookie season): 12 (2019)
- Most completions (rookie season): 284 (2019)
- Most pass attempts (rookie season): 459 (2019)
- Highest completion percentage (rookie season): 61.9% (2019)
- Most passing yards (rookie season): 3,027 (2019)
- Most passing touchdowns (rookie season): 24 (2019)
- Best passer rating (rookie season): 87.7 (2019)
- Most pass yards per game (rookie season): 232.8 (2019)
- Most fourth quarter comebacks (rookie season): 1 (2019) (tied with six other players)
- Most game winning drives (rookie season): 2 (2019)
- Longest quarterback run: 80 yards (October 22, 2020, vs. Philadelphia Eagles)
- First quarterback with 2,500+ passing yards and 400+ rushing yards in a single season (2020)
- First quarterback with 200 yards passing and 100 yards rushing in a single game (2022)
- Most rushing yards by a quarterback in a single season: 708 (2022)
- Most rushing yards by a quarterback in a career: 2,179

=== NFL records ===
- Most passing touchdowns in a single game by a rookie quarterback: 5 (December 22, 2019, vs. Washington Redskins) (tied with four others)
- First rookie to have three games with four touchdown passes and no interceptions
- First player to have 300-plus passing yards, 2-plus touchdown passes, and 70-plus rushing yards (including no interceptions) in a post-season playoff game.

== Personal life ==
Jones grew up as a fan of the Carolina Panthers, his hometown team.

Jones has a younger brother, Bates, who played one season of collegiate basketball at Duke during the 2021–22 season after four years with Davidson College.
