= Anthony Richardson (American football) =

American football player (born 2002)

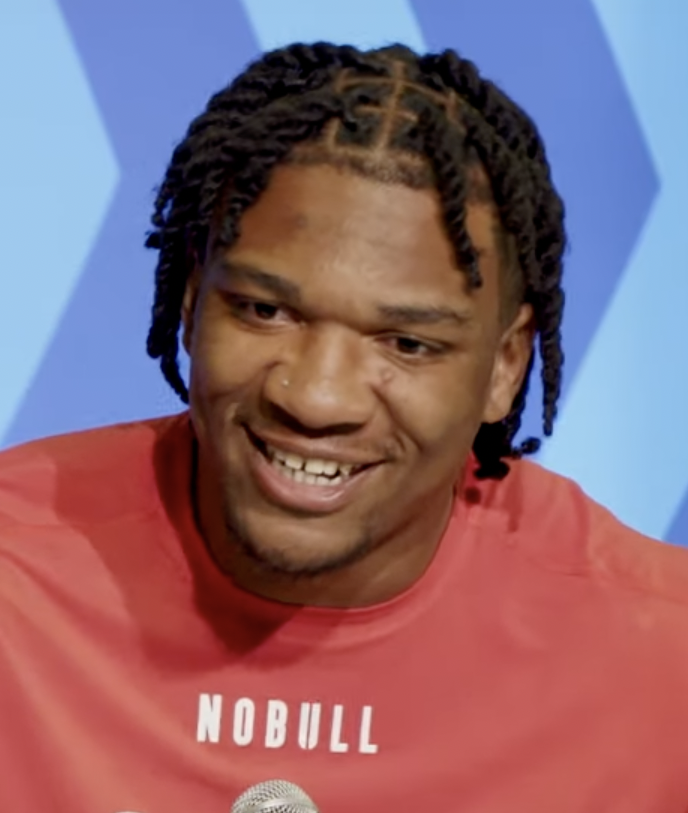
- Richardson in 2023

No. 5 – Indianapolis Colts
- Position: Quarterback
- Roster status: Active

Personal information
- Born: May 22, 2002 (age 24); Miami, Florida, U.S.
- Listed height: 6 ft 4 in (1.93 m)
- Listed weight: 244 lb (111 kg)

Career information
- High school: Eastside (Gainesville, Florida)
- College: Florida (2020–2022)
- NFL draft: 2023: 1st round, 4th overall pick

Career history
- Indianapolis Colts (2023–present)

Career NFL statistics as of Week 11, 2026
- Passing attempts: 354
- Passing completions: 179
- Completion percentage: 50.6%
- TD–INT: 11–13
- Passing yards: 2,408
- Passer rating: 67.6
- Rushing yards: 640
- Rushing touchdowns: 10
- Stats at Pro Football Reference

Anthony Dashawn Richardson Sr. (born May 22, 2002) is an American professional football quarterback for the Indianapolis Colts of the National Football League (NFL). He played college football for the Florida Gators and was selected by the Colts fourth overall in the 2023 NFL draft.

== Early life ==
Richardson was born on May 22, 2002, in Miami, Florida. He later attended Loften High School in Gainesville, Florida. However, Richardson played quarterback for Eastside High School's football team. During his high school career, Richardson had 4,633 passing yards with 37 passing touchdowns to go along with 1,633 rushing yards and 41 touchdowns. He committed to play college football at the University of Florida.

== College career ==
Richardson appeared in just four games during his first year at Florida in 2020, completing one of two passes for 27 yards with a touchdown and interception. He was able to redshirt his first year of collegiate eligibility. Richardson entered 2021 as the backup to Emory Jones. Against the LSU Tigers, he replaced Jones and completed 10 of 19 passes for 167 yards, three touchdowns, and two interceptions to go along with a rushing touchdown.

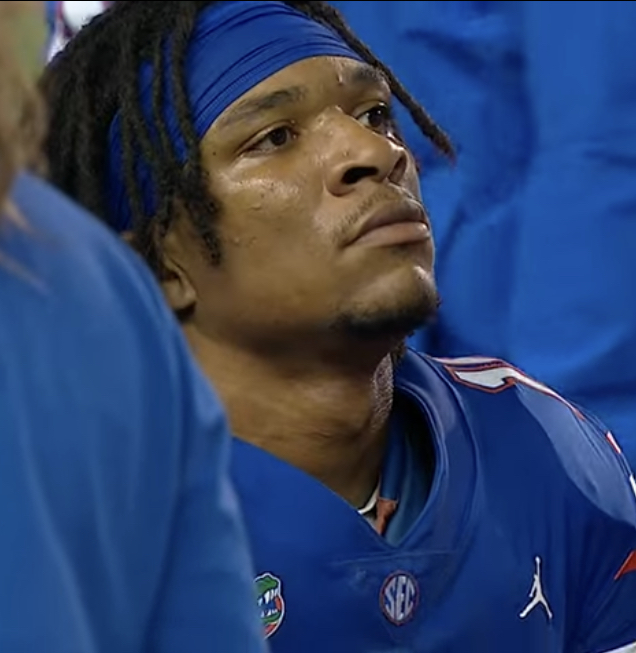
Richardson in 2022

Richardson officially became the starting quarterback for the Gators in 2022. In the first game of the season, he helped lead a 29–26 upset over the seventh-ranked Utah Utes on September 3, 2022. On September 24, in a 38–33 loss to the Tennessee Volunteers, Richardson had 453 passing yards, two touchdowns, and an interception to go along with 17 carries for 62 yards and two touchdowns.

Overall, in 2022, Richardson played in 12 games and passed for 2,549 yards, 17 touchdowns and nine interceptions, as well as rushing for 654 yards and 9 touchdowns in his first full season as a starting quarterback for a college team. During his time at Florida, Richardson amassed a 6–6 record as the starting quarterback for the Gators.

As a collegiate player, Richardson was stated to have displayed "dynamic talent" as a passer and runner during his college years but lacked accuracy and consistency. Richardson's physical gifts also helped propel him as a possible first-round NFL draft selection. Following the end of the 2022 season, Richardson announced that he would enter the 2023 NFL draft.

== Professional career ==
Pre-draft measurables
Height	Weight	Arm length	Hand span	Wingspan	40-yard dash	10-yard split	20-yard split	Vertical jump	Broad jump
6 ft 4 1/4 in (1.94 m)	244 lb (111 kg)	32 3/4 in (0.83 m)	10 1/2 in (0.27 m)	6 ft 7 7/8 in (2.03 m)	4.43 s	1.53 s	2.56 s	40.5 in (1.03 m)	10 ft 9 in (3.28 m)
All values from NFL Combine

=== 2023 ===
Richardson was drafted in the first round by the Indianapolis Colts with the fourth overall pick in the 2023 NFL draft.

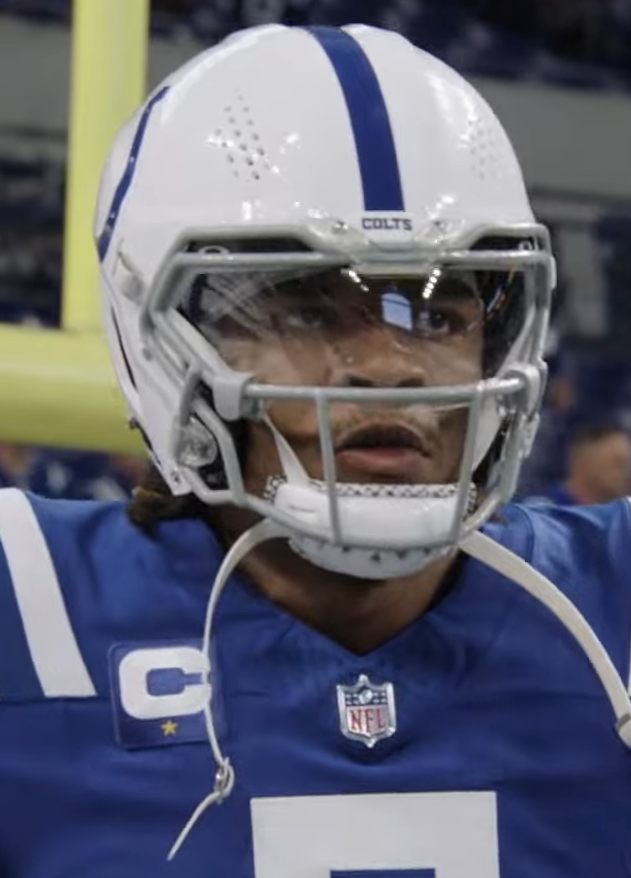
Richardson in 2023

During his first training camp with the Colts, Richardson underwent nasal septum surgery to improve his breathing. On August 15, 2023, Richardson was named by head coach Shane Steichen as the Colts' starting quarterback over Gardner Minshew and Sam Ehlinger.

Richardson made his NFL debut in the season-opener against the Jacksonville Jaguars. He threw his first touchdown pass to Michael Pittman Jr., ran for a touchdown, and threw his first career interception to Tyson Campbell in the 31–21 loss. During Week 2 against the Houston Texans, Richardson ran for two touchdowns before leaving the eventual 31–20 road victory with a concussion in the second quarter as a result of a hit taken as he scored his second touchdown. On September 22, Richardson was declared out in Week 3 due to a concussion he suffered against the Texans. He returned the following week against the Los Angeles Rams and recorded two passing touchdowns and a rushing touchdown, erasing a 23-point deficit in a 29–23 overtime loss. His rushing touchdown in this game marked the first time in NFL history that a rookie quarterback had scored a rushing touchdown in each of his first three starts. On October 9, Richardson was placed on injured reserve due to a grade three AC joint sprain he suffered in Week 5 against the Tennessee Titans, which was initially announced for him to miss one-to-two months. On October 18, the Colts announced that Richardson would miss the rest of the season, and he successfully underwent shoulder surgery to repair the sprain six days later.

=== 2024 ===
Richardson opened the season as the Colts' starter after recovering from shoulder surgery the previous year. He missed Weeks 5 and 6 with an oblique injury. In Week 8 against the Texans, Richardson completed 10 of 32 passes for 175 yards, a touchdown, and an interception. He also voluntarily took himself out for one play in the third quarter, stating that he "needed a breather" as the Colts lost 23–20. Richardson was benched the following week in favor of backup quarterback Joe Flacco. Prior to the benching, Richardson had generated an NFL-worst 44.4% completion percentage in six games.

After two losses with Flacco, the Colts announced that Richardson would be the starter for the remainder of the season, beginning in their Week 11 matchup against the New York Jets. In his return as starter, Richardson completed 67% of his passes for a career-high 272 yards, a touchdown, and added two rushing scores, including the game-winner in the final minute as the Colts won 28–27. In Week 13, Richardson orchestrated a 19-play, 80-yard touchdown drive, capped off with a go-ahead two-point conversion with under 15 seconds left as the Colts came back to win 25–24 over the New England Patriots. Richardson missed the final two games of the season with a back injury as the Colts missed the playoffs with a loss in Week 17 to the New York Giants. He finished the season completing 47.7 percent of his 264 passing attempts for 1,814 yards, eight touchdowns, and 12 interceptions. He also rushed 86 times for 499 yards with six touchdowns.

=== 2025 ===
With the signing of quarterback Daniel Jones in March 2025, Richardson opened the offseason in a competition with Jones for the starting quarterback job. On August 19, Jones was named the starter, with Richardson named a backup to begin his third NFL season. On October 13, Richardson was placed on injured reserve after he fractured the orbital bone in his eye during pregame warmups the previous day.

=== 2026 ===
On April 30, 2026, the Colts declined the fifth-year option on Richardson's contract, making him a free agent after the 2026 season. On November 20, 2026, Richardson was named the starting quarterback after the Colts released Daniel Jones following a loss against the Houston Texans.

== Career statistics ==
=== NFL ===
Legend
**Bold**	Career high

Year	Team	Games			Passing									Rushing					Sacks		Fumbles	
Year	Team	GP	GS	Record	Cmp	Att	Pct	Yds	Y/A	Lng	TD	Int	Rtg	Att	Yds	Avg	Lng	TD	Sck	SckY	Fum	Lost
2023	IND	4	4	2–2	50	84	**59.5**	577	**6.9**	39	3	1	**87.3**	25	136	5.4	23	4	7	29	3	1
2024	IND	**11**	**11**	**6–5**	**126**	**264**	47.7	**1,814**	**6.9**	**69**	**8**	**12**	61.6	**86**	**499**	**5.8**	**29**	**6**	**14**	**115**	**9**	**3**
2025	IND	2	0	—	1	2	50.0	9	4.5	9	0	0	62.5	4	-1	-0.3	2	0	0	0	0	0
2026	IND	2	0	—	2	4	50.0	8	2.0	5	0	0	56.2	3	6	2.0	5	0	1	10	0	0
Career		19	15	8–7	179	354	50.9	2,408	6.8	69	11	13	67.6	118	640	5.4	29	10	22	154	12	4

=== College ===
Season	Team	Games			Passing								Rushing			
Season	Team	GP	GS	Record	Cmp	Att	Pct	Yds	Avg	TD	Int	Rtg	Att	Yds	Avg	TD
2020	Florida	4	0	—	1	2	50.0	27	**13.5**	1	1	**228.4**	7	61	8.7	0
2021	Florida	8	1	0–1	38	64	**59.4**	529	8.3	6	5	**144.1**	51	401	**7.9**	3
2022	Florida	12	12	**6–6**	**176**	**327**	53.8	**2,549**	7.8	**17**	**9**	131.1	**103**	**654**	6.3	**9**
Career		24	13	6–7	215	393	54.7	3,105	7.9	24	15	133.6	161	1,116	6.9	12

== Personal life ==
On October 23, 2026, Richardson faced a misdemeanor charge for marijuana possession following a traffic stop in Carmel, Indiana that happened on October 12.
