= Ed Dodds =

American football executive

Indianapolis Colts
- Title: Interim general manager

Career information
- College: Texas A&M–Kingsville

Career history
- Oakland Raiders (2003–2006) Intern; Seattle Seahawks (2007–2016); Pro scout (2007); Area scout (2008–2013); National scout (2014); Senior personnel executive (2015–2016); Indianapolis Colts (2017–present); Vice president of player personnel (2017); Assistant general manager (2018–2026); Interim general manager (2026–present)

Awards and highlights
- Super Bowl champion (XLVIII)
- Executive profile at Pro Football Reference

Ed Dodds is an American football executive who is the interim general manager for the Indianapolis Colts of the National Football League (NFL). He began his career as an intern for the Oakland Raiders in the early 2000s before becoming a senior personnel executive for the Seattle Seahawks and joining the Indianapolis Colts in 2017.

== Executive career ==
=== Oakland Raiders ===
In 2003, Dodds began his career as a scouting intern for the Oakland Raiders.

=== Seattle Seahawks ===
In 2007, Dodds was hired by the Seattle Seahawks as a pro scout. In 2008, he was promoted to area scout and in 2014, he was promoted to national scout.

In 2015, Dodds was promoted to senior personnel executive.

=== Indianapolis Colts ===
In 2017, Dodds was hired by the Indianapolis Colts as their vice president of player personnel under general manager Chris Ballard.

In 2018, Dodds was promoted to assistant general manager.

On October 19, 2026, after the Colts fired general manager Chris Ballard, Dodds was named the team's interim general manager.
