= Edward E. Dodds =

Edward Edwin Dodds
- Born: c. 1845; Port Hope, Canada West
- Died: January 12, 1901
- Burial place: Canton Cemetery
- Military career
- Allegiance: United States of America
- Branch: United States Army
- Service years: 1863 - 1865
- Rank: Sergeant
- Unit: (New York (state)) 21st New York Volunteer Cavalry Company C
- Awards: Medal of Honor

Edward Edwin Dodds (c. 1845 to January 12, 1901) was a Canadian soldier who fought with the Union Army as a member of the 21st New York Cavalry during the American Civil War. He received the United States' highest award for bravery during combat, the Medal of Honor, for his actions at Ashbys Gap, Virginia on July 19, 1864. That award was conferred on June 11, 1896.

== Formative years ==
Born near Port Hope, Canada West in about 1845, Edward Edwin Dodds was a son of Thomas Dodd (1811–1885) and Sarah (Young) Dodd (1811–1894).

== American Civil War ==
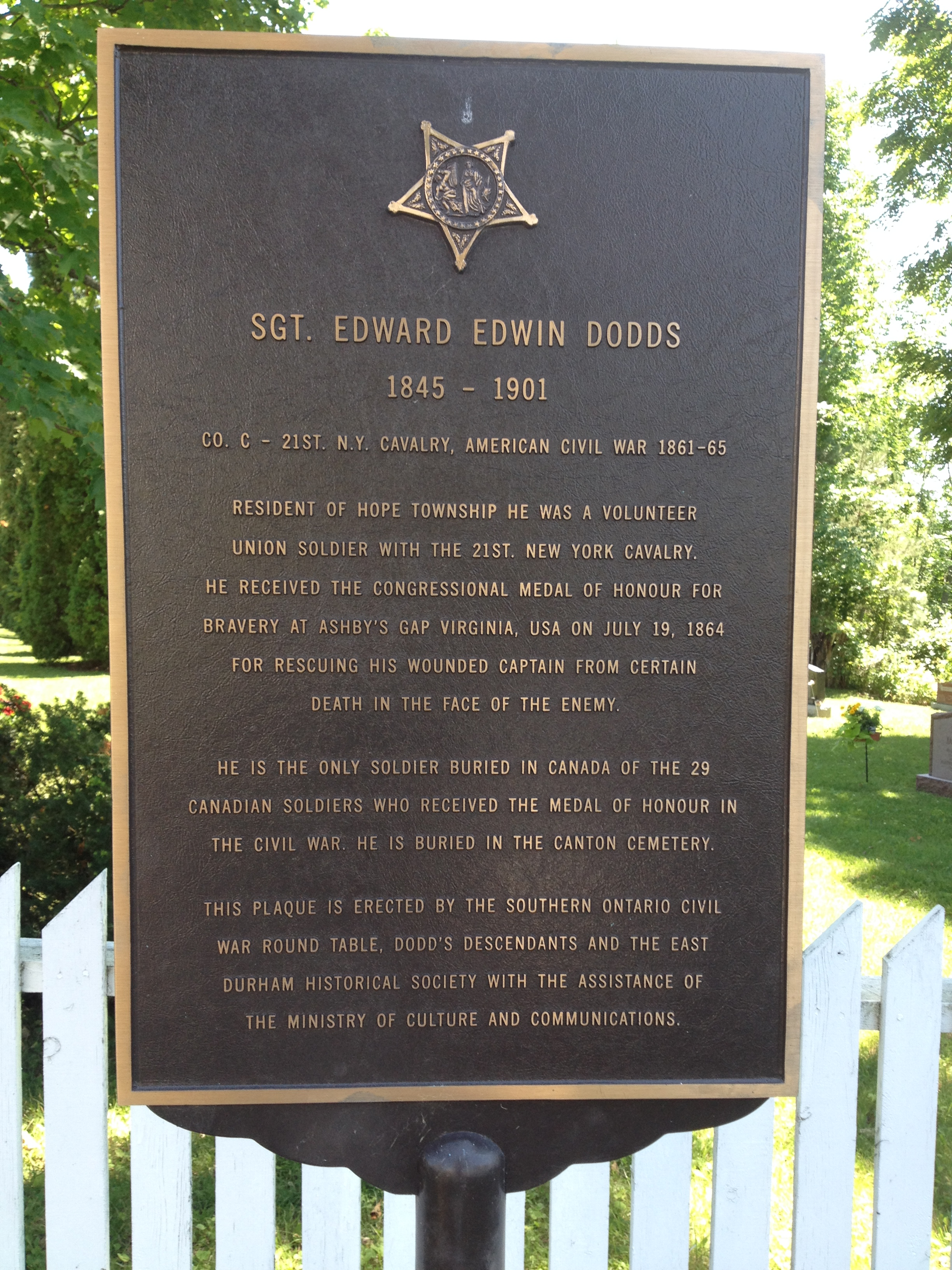
Canton, Ontario Cemetery historical marker memorializing Canadian Edward E. Dodd's acts of valor in the American Civil War.

At the age of 21, Dodds enlisted for a three-year term of military service in the American Civil War. Enrolling at Rochester, New York, on July 31, 1863, he then officially mustered in on August 28 as a private with Company C of the 21st New York Volunteer Cavalry (also known as the Griswold Light Cavalry). Promoted to the rank of sergeant on May 1, 1864, he was wounded in action at Bolivar Heights near Harpers Ferry, Virginia.

He then joined his regiment in the fighting at Ashby Gap, Virginia, on July 19, 1864. During the minor engagement, known as the Battle of Ashby's Gap, a small group of Union cavalrymen, including members of the 21st New York, attempted to cross the gap in order to disrupt the movement of Confederate Lieutenant-General Jubal Early's army by crossing the gap and attacking supply trains bringing up the rear of Early's forces during the Valley Campaigns of 1864. During the engagement, when one of his regiment's captains was placed at risk of enemy capture after falling wounded on the field, Dodds rescued that captain while under heavy enemy fire, and moved him to safer Union-held territory. An 1896 letter to the newspaper of Dodds' adopted hometown, Rochester's Democrat and Chronicle provided more details regarding Dodds' actions that day:

The 21st N. Y. Cavalry crossed the river at Ashbey's [sic] Gap, in their advance, and very soon afterwards came upon the enemy in force, in the woods, who opened a sharp fire upon them. They were not nearly sufficient in number to withstand the attack and a retreat was ordered. At this time the captain of C Company was severely wounded and his horse killed, and the captain found himself unable to extricate himself from his fallen horse. With the bullets flying around him, Sergeant Dodds dismounted, disengaged his captain and assisted him onto his own horse, which he also remounted. The enemy had meanwhile got around to the rear, and when our hero arrived at the ford he found it already occupied. Undismayed by this circumstance he turned his horse along the bank until he came to a favorable spot, when he leaped his horse into the river and swam across under fire, reaching the union lines in safety with his captain, who afterwards recovered and is among those who testified to the war department as to the incident. The evidence submitted shows that this is but one of many occasions in which Sergeant Dodds exhibited "distinguished gallantry in action," but I will only mention the fact that he was afterwards so severely wounded in the right arm that that member had to be amputated at the shoulder. This, of course, necessitated some time in hospital, but instead of asking for his discharge, Sergeant Dodds rejoined his command as soon as he was able to do so, and served until the close of the war, when he was mustered out with his comrades.

Dodds was, in fact, discharged on a surgeon's certificate of disability on July 29, 1865, at Alexandria, Virginia "by reason loss of right arm and other wounds received at the Battle of Winchester, Virginia".

== Post-war life ==
Following his honorable discharge from the U.S. Army and 21st New York Volunteers, Dodds opted to remain in the United States. Settling in the community where he initially enrolled for military service — Rochester, New York, he secured employment as a reporter with Rochester's newspaper, the Democrat and Chronicle.

During the 1870s, he chose to return home to Canada, where, in 1877, he became Town Clerk of Hope Township in Northumberland County, Ontario. From October 13, 1892, until at least early 1896, he served as the U.S. Consular Agent for Port Hope's Peterborough office. During this time, according to historian Marsha Ann Tate, Ph.D., Dodds was "[a]rguably one of the most noteworthy individuals associated with the Port Hope Commercial Agency." Engaged in the newspaper business in both the United States and Canada, he also "'professed a fair knowledge of international law' and was 'a Republican.'"

Dodds was preceded in death by his parents, Thomas and Sarah Dodds, who died, respectively, on August 25, 1885, and October 24, 1894. Both were laid to rest at the Canton Cemetery in Canton, Ontario, Canada. Two years later, on June 11, 1896, he was awarded the U.S. Medal of Honor.

Dodds died on January 12, 1901, and was laid to rest at the same cemetery where his parents had been interred — the Canton Cemetery in Northumberland County.

== Medal of Honor citation ==
While engaged with Confederate forces at Ashbys Gap, Virginia, on July 19, 1864, a captain of the 21st New York Cavalry fell wounded on the battlefield and lay at the mercy of the enemy. Without regard for his own safety, Sergeant Edward Dodds braved the fusillade to go to his captain's side, and carry him to a place of safety.

== See also ==
- List of American Civil War Medal of Honor recipients: A–F
