= Chris Ballard (American football) =

American football executive (born 1969)

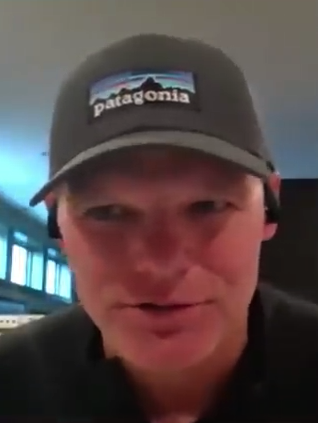
- Ballard in 2020

Profile
- Title: General manager

Personal information
- Born: June 24, 1969 (age 57); Galveston, Texas, U.S.

Career information
- Position: Wide receiver
- College: University of Wisconsin–Madison

Career history

Coaching
- Texas A&M–Kingsville (1994) Wide receivers coach; Texas A&M–Kingsville (1995–1998) Secondary coach; Texas A&M–Kingsville (1999) Defensive coordinator & secondary coach

Operations
- Chicago Bears (2001–2011) Scout; Chicago Bears (2012) Director of pro scouting; Kansas City Chiefs (2013–2014) Director of player personnel; Kansas City Chiefs (2015–2016) Director of football operations; Indianapolis Colts (2017–2026) General manager

Awards and highlights
- PFWA Executive of the Year (2018)
- Executive profile at Pro Football Reference

Christopher R. Ballard (born June 24, 1969) is an American professional football executive who previously was the general manager for the Indianapolis Colts of the National Football League (NFL) from 2017 to 2026. Before joining the Colts, he was an executive for the Kansas City Chiefs, serving as the director of player personnel and then as the director of football operations. Ballard was also a scout for the Chicago Bears and served in various coaching roles at Texas A&M University–Kingsville.

== Early life ==
Ballard was born in Galveston, Texas. Growing up a severe asthmatic in Texas, as well as Wisconsin, his parents reluctantly let him play football at a young age. Ballard was a star quarterback in high school at Texas City High School. His favorite NFL team was once the Pittsburgh Steelers, and his favorite player was Terry Bradshaw.

Ballard attended the University of Wisconsin–Madison and switched his position to wide receiver as a freshman. Ballard suffered knee injuries and was forced to retire from playing during his senior year at Wisconsin, working as a student assistant in the aftermath. He graduated with a Bachelor of Arts degree in 1993.

== Career ==
=== Early career ===
After college, Ballard became a history teacher for Hitchcock Junior High while also contributing to their football program. After a referral from Hitchcock's head coach, Ballard joined the Texas A&M–Kingsville Javelinas football team coaching wide receivers in 1994. He would remain for seven seasons on the staff of Javelinas head coach Ron Harms, taking over as secondary coach in 1995 and mentoring future NFL players Floyd Young and Al Harris.

=== Chicago Bears ===
In 2001, Ballard joined the Chicago Bears' scouting department. It was during this time that he declined a job offer to run first-year coach Art Briles's secondary at the University of Houston. Ballard contributed to Chicago's success in the 12 years he was there. In 2012, he received a promotion to director of pro scouting. Ballard would only remain in this position for one season. During his time with the Bears, Ballard was said to be involved with many acquisitions such as Matt Forte, Johnny Knox, Brandon Marshall, and Martellus Bennett.

=== Kansas City Chiefs ===
Prior to the 2013 season, Ballard joined the Kansas City Chiefs as director of player personnel. He stayed in that position until becoming the director of football operations the end of the 2014 season. Ballard remained with the team until the conclusion of the 2016 regular season. While with the Chiefs, Ballard was involved in drafting Pro-Bowlers Travis Kelce, Tyreek Hill, and Marcus Peters.

=== Indianapolis Colts ===
In the midst of the 2016 NFL Playoffs, Ballard was introduced as the new general manager of the Indianapolis Colts. The Colts would have a losing record in Ballard's first season as their general manager. Prior to his second season, the Colts fired head coach Chuck Pagano. Despite the Colts announcing that they had signed New England Patriots offensive coordinator Josh McDaniels, McDaniels unexpectedly withdrew from the agreement in principle. On February 11, 2018, the Colts announced Frank Reich as their new head coach.

The Colts finished the 2018 season with a 10–6 record, and two of Ballard's 2018 draft choices, Quenton Nelson and Shaquille Leonard, were named to the AP All-Pro First Team, becoming the first set of rookie teammates to be named First Team All-Pro since 1965 and only the second in NFL history. Leonard was also named the NFL Defensive Rookie of the Year. Ballard was named the NFL Executive of the Year by the Pro Football Writers of America in 2018.

In August 2021, Ballard signed a five-year contract extension with the Colts.

On October 19, 2026, Ballard was fired by the Colts after losing at home to the 0-5 Tennessee Titans. He ended his time as general manager with a 72–82–1 regular-season record. During his tenure, the Colts made the playoffs twice, won one postseason game, and never won the AFC South title. Writing for The Athletic, Zak Keefer opined, "The Irsays offered Ballard ample time to build a contender. He never did. And he never came close. And now this sorry, stale era for the franchise [...] is over, but only after sucking the life out of a fanbase that's gone from apoplectic to downright apathetic."

== Personal life ==
Ballard and his wife, Kristin, have three children and adopted two more in 2012. One of their sons, Cole, is a backup quarterback for the Kansas Jayhawks football team.
