= 2025 Indianapolis Colts season =

73rd season in franchise history

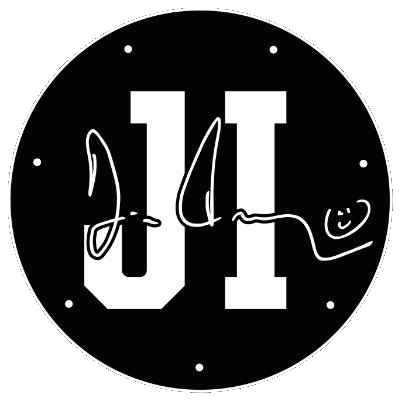
- Owner: Carlie Irsay-Gordon (CEO); Casey Foyt; Kalen Jackson
- General manager: Chris Ballard
- Head coach: Shane Steichen
- Home stadium: Lucas Oil Stadium

Results
- Record: 8–9
- Division place: 3rd AFC South
- Playoffs: Did not qualify
- All-Pros: OG Quenton Nelson (2nd team)
- Pro Bowlers: OG Quenton Nelson; RB Jonathan Taylor; TE Tyler Warren

Uniform
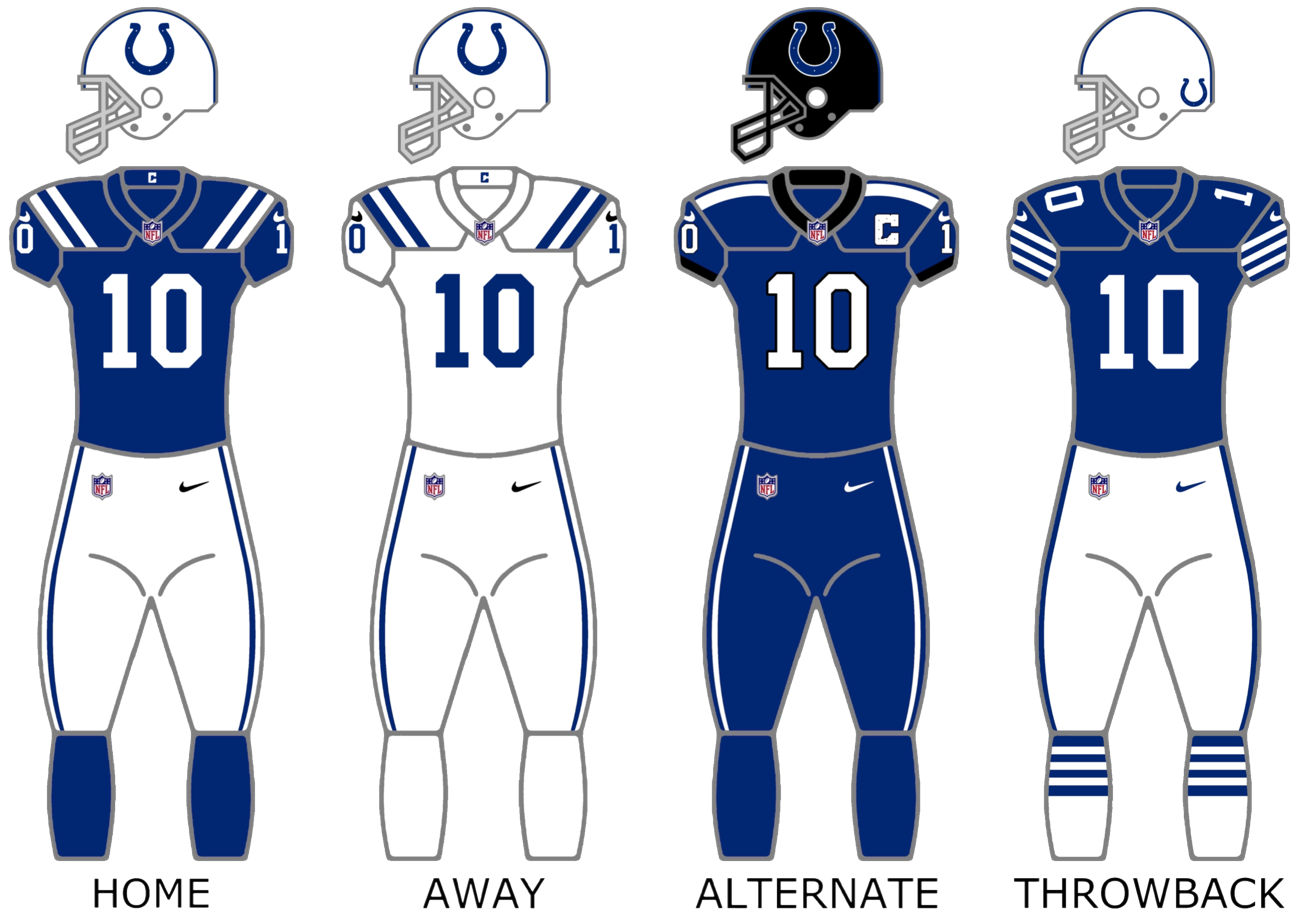

The 2025 season was the Indianapolis Colts' 73rd in the National Football League (NFL), their 42nd in Indianapolis, and their 18th playing their home games at Lucas Oil Stadium. It was also their ninth under the leadership of general manager Chris Ballard and their third under head coach Shane Steichen. The Colts matched their 8–9 record from last year following a Week 10 overtime victory against the Atlanta Falcons in Berlin. Following the death of owner Jim Irsay on May 21, 2025, this was the first season of ownership split among his three daughters, Carlie Irsay-Gordon, Kalen Jackson, and Casey Foyt. On May 27, 2025, the Colts announced that they would add Jim Irsay patches to their uniforms throughout the entire season in his honor. On June 13, 2025, the Colts announced that they would induct Jim Irsay into their Ring of Honor during their 2025 home opener.

Before the season, the Colts brought in veteran quarterback Daniel Jones, who won the starting position over Anthony Richardson. The Colts won their first season opener since 2013 with a 33–8 blowout win over the Miami Dolphins, ending a streak of 11 consecutive seasons not winning the first game of their season. The Colts were the first team in NFL history to score on their first 10 possessions of the season, and their 103 points through the first three games are the most to start a season since moving to Indianapolis, 2 more than they scored in their first 3 games in 2000. It was, however, 14 less than what they scored in their first 3 games in 1967 when they were based in Baltimore. The team's 8–2 start was their best start since they started 14–0 in their 2009 season, when they went on to reach and lose Super Bowl XLIV, and they were one win away from topping last year's record. However, despite this strong start as well as leading the AFC South, they suffered a late-season collapse and proceeded to end the season on a 7-game losing streak after their bye week, with Jones suffering a season-ending Achilles injury in Week 14 against the Jacksonville Jaguars as well. They were eliminated from playoff contention for the 5th consecutive season after the Houston Texans defeated the Los Angeles Chargers in Week 17. As a result, the Colts became the first team since the 2012 Chicago Bears to start the season 7–1 yet miss the playoffs. After a Week 18 loss to the Houston Texans, the Colts became the first team in NFL history to finish the season with a losing record after an 8–2 start. It was also the first time since the 1997–1998 seasons that the Colts suffered consecutive losing seasons. During the season, Jonathan Taylor broke Colts legend Edgerrin James' record for most rushing touchdowns as a Colt with 69; the previous record was 64. Although the Colts matched their 8–9 record from last season, 7 of the losses were by 8 points or fewer.

== Offseason ==
=== Players additions ===
Position	Player	Former team	Date
S	Camryn Bynum	Minnesota Vikings	March 12
QB	Daniel Jones	Minnesota Vikings	March 13
CB	Charvarius Ward	San Francisco 49ers	March 13
LB	Joe Bachie	Cincinnati Bengals	May 7
CB	Xavien Howard	Miami Dolphins	August 18

=== Players lost ===
Position	Player	New team	Date
C	Ryan Kelly	Minnesota Vikings	March 12
G	Will Fries	Minnesota Vikings	March 12
DE	Dayo Odeyingbo	Chicago Bears	March 13
LB	Grant Stuard	Detroit Lions	March 13
TE	Kylen Granson	Philadelphia Eagles	March 20
LB	E. J. Speed	Houston Texans	March 29
QB	Sam Ehlinger	Denver Broncos	March 31
QB	Joe Flacco	Cleveland Browns	April 11

=== Draft ===
2025 Indianapolis Colts draft selections
Round	Selection	Player	Position	College	Notes
1	14	Tyler Warren	TE	Penn State	
2	45	JT Tuimoloau	DE	Ohio State	
3	80	Justin Walley	CB	Minnesota	
4	117	Traded to the Los Angeles Rams			
4	127	Jalen Travis	OT	Iowa State	From LA Rams
5	151	DJ Giddens	RB	Kansas State	
6	189	Riley Leonard	QB	Notre Dame	
6	190	Tim Smith	DT	Alabama	From LA Rams
7	232	Hunter Wohler	OLB	Wisconsin	

2025 Indianapolis Colts undrafted free agents
Name	Position	College	Ref.
Devonta Davis	OT	Florida Atlantic	
Solomon DeShields	LB	Texas A&M	
Johnathan Edwards	CB	Tulane	
Joe Evans	OT	UTSA	
Marshall Foerner	OT	Minnesota State	
Tyler Kahmann	WR	Emporia State	
Desmond Little	DE	UAB	
Maximilian Mang	TE	Syracuse	
Coleman Owen	WR	Ohio	
Landon Parker	WR	Troy	
Blayne Taylor	WR	Abilene Christian	
Ladarius Tennison	S	UCF	
Maddux Trujillo	K	Temple	
Trey Washington	S	Mississippi State	
Wyett Ekeler	S	Wyoming	

== Staff ==
2025 Indianapolis Colts staff
Front office: Owner/CEO – Carlie Irsay-Gordon; Owner/executive vice president – Casey Foyt; Owner/chief brand officer – Kalen Jackson; General manager – Chris Ballard; Assistant general manager – Ed Dodds; Director of player personnel – Kevin Rogers Jr.; Director of football administration – Mike Bluem; Director of pro scouting – Jon Shaw; Assistant director of pro scouting – Joey Elliott; Director of college scouting – Matt Terpening; Assistant director of college scouting – Jamie Moore; Senior player personnel scout – Todd Vasvari; Director of football analytics – Greg Starek; Head coaches: Head coach – Shane Steichen; Offensive coaches: Offensive coordinator – Jim Bob Cooter; Passing game coordinator – Alex Tanney; Quarterbacks – Cameron Turner; Running backs – DeAndre Smith; Wide receivers – Reggie Wayne; Tight ends – Tom Manning; Offensive line – Tony Sparano Jr.; Assistant offensive line – Chris Watt; Offensive quality control/wide receivers – Brian Bratton; Tony Dungy diversity coaching fellow – Diego Ortiz	Defensive coaches: Defensive coordinator – Lou Anarumo; Defensive line – Charlie Partridge; Senior assistant/defensive line – Matt Raich; Linebackers – James Bettcher; Assistant linebackers – Cato June; Pass game coordinator/Secondary – Chris Hewitt; Defensive backs – Jerome Henderson; Defensive assistant – Brent Stocksill; Defensive quality control – Brent Jackson; Tony Dungy diversity coaching fellow – Kalon Humphries; Special teams coaches: Special teams coordinator – Brian Mason; Senior assistant special teams – Joe Hastings; Assistant to the head coach – T. J. Ingels; Game manager – Charlie Gelman; Harriet P. Irsay fellow – Isabel Diaz; Strength and conditioning: Director of sports performance – Mike Minnis; Senior head strength and conditioning – Richard Howell; Strength and conditioning assistant – Zane Fakes; Strength and conditioning assistant/performance therapist – Sam Khym; Assistant sports science/analytics – Mikey Blazejowski; Applied sports science/conditioning – Doug McKenney

== Final roster ==
2025 Indianapolis Colts roster
Quarterbacks (QB): 15 Riley Leonard; 17 Philip Rivers; Running backs (RB): 26 Ameer Abdullah; 21 DJ Giddens; 31 Tyler Goodson; 28 Jonathan Taylor; Wide receivers (WR): 1 Josh Downs; 16 Ashton Dulin; 14 Alec Pierce; 11 Michael Pittman Jr.; 13 Laquon Treadwell; Tight ends (TE): 81 Mo Alie-Cox; 86 Will Mallory; 84 Tyler Warren	Offensive linemen (OL): 60 Tanor Bortolini C; 71 Matt Goncalves G/T; 56 Quenton Nelson G; 63 Danny Pinter C/G; 79 Bernhard Raimann T; 67 Luke Tenuta T; 75 Jalen Travis T; 68 Dalton Tucker G; Defensive linemen (DL): 95 Adetomiwa Adebawore DT; 52 Samson Ebukam DE; 92 Neville Gallimore DT; 98 Eric Johnson DT; 97 Laiatu Latu DE; 94 Tyquan Lewis DE; 51 Kwity Paye DE; 90 Grover Stewart DT; 91 JT Tuimoloau DE; 96 Chris Wormley DT	Linebackers (LB): 58 Austin Ajiake MLB; 57 Jaylon Carlies OLB; 44 Zaire Franklin MLB; 59 Buddy Johnson OLB; 50 Segun Olubi OLB; 53 Germaine Pratt OLB; Defensive backs (DB): 29 Mekhi Blackmon CB; 0 Camryn Bynum FS; 20 Nick Cross SS; 35 Johnathan Edwards CB; 1 Sauce Gardner CB; 40 Jaylon Jones CB; 36 Reuben Lowery SS; 43 Cameron Mitchell CB; 23 Kenny Moore CB; 39 George Odum SS; 25 Rodney Thomas II FS; Special teams (ST): 10 Blake Grupe K; 46 Luke Rhodes LS; 8 Rigoberto Sanchez P	Practice squad: 37 Ulysses Bentley IV RB; 42 Wyett Ekeler FS; 61 Viliami Fehoko DE; 69 LaDarius Henderson G; 4 Seth Henigan QB; 33 Mike Hilton CB (PS/I); 78 Bayron Matos T (IPP); 49 Sean McKeon TE; 65 Jimmy Morrissey C; 62 Bill Murray G; 74 Durell Nchami DE; 34 Ben Nikkel FS; 9 Coleman Owen WR; 83 Eli Pancol WR; 47 Troy Pride CB; 66 Josh Sills G; 93 Tim Smith DT; 41 Trey Washington SS; Reserve: 36 Salvon Ahmed RB (IR); 99 DeForest Buckner DT (IR); 73 Blake Freeland T (IR); 6 Anthony Gould WR (IR); 17 Daniel Jones QB (IR); 38 Chris Lammons CB (IR); 2 D. J. Montgomery WR (IR); 85 Drew Ogletree TE (IR); 54 Jacob Phillips OLB (IR); 5 Anthony Richardson QB (IR/DFR); 32 Daniel Scott SS (IR); 3 Spencer Shrader K (IR); 72 Braden Smith T (IR); 27 Justin Walley CB (IR); 7 Charvarius Ward CB (IR); 76 Jack Wilson T (IR); 30 Hunter Wohler SS (IR); Rookies in italics 52 active, 17 reserve, 17 practice squad (2 exempt)

== Preseason ==
Week	Date	Opponent	Result	Record	Venue	Recap
1	August 7	at Baltimore Ravens	L 16–24	0–1	M&T Bank Stadium	Recap
2	August 16	Green Bay Packers	L 19–23	0–2	Lucas Oil Stadium	Recap
3	August 23	at Cincinnati Bengals	W 41–14	1–2	Paycor Stadium	Recap

== Regular season ==
=== Schedule ===
Week	Date	Opponent	Result	Record	Venue	Recap
1	September 7	Miami Dolphins	**W** 33–8	1–0	Lucas Oil Stadium	Recap
2	September 14	Denver Broncos	**W** 29–28	2–0	Lucas Oil Stadium	Recap
3	September 21	at **Tennessee Titans**	**W** 41–20	3–0	Nissan Stadium	Recap
4	September 28	at Los Angeles Rams	**L** 20–27	3–1	SoFi Stadium	Recap
5	October 5	Las Vegas Raiders	**W** 40–6	4–1	Lucas Oil Stadium	Recap
6	October 12	Arizona Cardinals	**W** 31–27	5–1	Lucas Oil Stadium	Recap
7	October 19	at Los Angeles Chargers	**W** 38–24	6–1	SoFi Stadium	Recap
8	October 26	**Tennessee Titans**	**W** 38–14	7–1	Lucas Oil Stadium	Recap
9	November 2	at Pittsburgh Steelers	**L** 20–27	7–2	Acrisure Stadium	Recap
10	November 9	Atlanta Falcons	**W** 31–25 (OT)	8–2	(Germany) Olympiastadion (Berlin)	Recap
11	Bye					
12	November 23	at Kansas City Chiefs	**L** 20–23 (OT)	8–3	Arrowhead Stadium	Recap
13	November 30	**Houston Texans**	**L** 16–20	8–4	Lucas Oil Stadium	Recap
14	December 7	at **Jacksonville Jaguars**	**L** 19–36	8–5	EverBank Stadium	Recap
15	December 14	at Seattle Seahawks	**L** 16–18	8–6	Lumen Field	Recap
16	December 22	San Francisco 49ers	**L** 27–48	8–7	Lucas Oil Stadium	Recap
17	December 28	**Jacksonville Jaguars**	**L** 17–23	8–8	Lucas Oil Stadium	Recap
18	January 4	at **Houston Texans**	**L** 30–38	8–9	NRG Stadium	Recap

Note: Intra-division opponents are in bold text.

=== Game summaries ===
==== Week 1: vs. Miami Dolphins ====
Week 1: Miami Dolphins at Indianapolis Colts – Game summary

Quarter	1	2	3	4	Total
Dolphins	0	0	0	8	**8**
**Colts**	3	17	3	10	**33**

at Lucas Oil Stadium, Indianapolis, Indiana

- Date: September 7
- Game time: 1:00 p.m. EDT
- Game weather: Sunny & 70⁰ (retractable roof open)
- Game attendance: 64,065
- Referee: Brad Allen
- TV announcers (CBS): Andrew Catalon, Charles Davis, Jason McCourty and AJ Ross
- Recap, Game Book

Game information

**First quarter**

- IND – Spencer Shrader 24-yard field goal, 10:37. Colts 3–0. **Drive: 9 plays, 62 yards, 4:23.**

**Second quarter**

- IND – Michael Pittman Jr. 27-yard pass from Daniel Jones (Spencer Shrader kick), 14:54. Colts 10–0. **Drive: 14 plays, 84 yards, 8:18.**
- IND – Daniel Jones 1-yard run (Spencer Shrader kick), 12:01. Colts 17–0. **Drive: 5 plays, 42 yards, 2:13.**
- IND – Spencer Shrader 35-yard field goal, 0:00. Colts 20–0. **Drive: 17 plays, 72 yards, 6:46.**

**Third quarter**

- IND – Spencer Shrader 28-yard field goal, 7:30. Colts 23–0. **Drive: 7 plays, 48 yards, 3:49.**

**Fourth quarter**

- IND – Daniel Jones 1-yard run (Spencer Shrader kick), 10:14. Colts 30–0. **Drive: 15 plays, 69 yards, 9:16.**
- MIA – De'Von Achane 11-yard pass from Tua Tagovailoa (Tua Tagovailoa–Julian Hill pass), 6:21. Colts 30–8. **Drive: 9 plays, 65 yards, 3:53.**
- IND – Spencer Shrader 48-yard field goal, 2:23. Colts 33–8. **Drive: 7 plays, 21 yards, 3:58.**

**Top passers**

- MIA – Tua Tagovailoa – 14/23, 114 yards, TD, 2 INT
- IND – Daniel Jones – 22/29, 272 yards, TD

**Top rushers**

- MIA – De'Von Achane – 7 rushes, 55 yards
- IND – Jonathan Taylor – 18 rushes, 71 yards

**Top receivers**

- MIA – Tyreek Hill – 4 receptions, 40 yards
- IND – Michael Pittman Jr. – 6 receptions, 80 yards, TD

With the win, the Colts started 1–0 for the first time since 2013. Quarterback Daniel Jones, in his debut with the Colts, led every single drive to a touchdown or field goal, the first time this has happened in the NFL since 1978.

==== Week 2: vs. Denver Broncos ====
Week 2: Denver Broncos at Indianapolis Colts – Game summary

Quarter	1	2	3	4	Total
Broncos	7	14	7	0	**28**
**Colts**	6	14	3	6	**29**

at Lucas Oil Stadium, Indianapolis, Indiana

- Date: September 14
- Game time: 4:05 p.m. EDT
- Game weather: None (retractable roof closed)
- Game attendance: 63,910
- Referee: Craig Wrolstad
- TV announcers (CBS): Kevin Harlan, Trent Green and Melanie Collins
- Recap, Game Book

Game information

**First quarter**

- IND – Spencer Shrader 29-yard field goal, 11:51. Colts 3–0. **Drive: 9 plays, 61 yards, 3:09.**
- DEN – Marvin Mims 23-yard pass from Bo Nix (Wil Lutz kick), 8:24. Broncos 7–3. **Drive: 6 plays, 64 yards, 3:27.**
- IND – Spencer Shrader 33-yard field goal, 4:19. Broncos 7–6. **Drive: 8 plays, 55 yards, 4:05.**

**Second quarter**

- IND – Daniel Jones 1-yard run (Spencer Shrader kick), 14:12. Colts 13–7. **Drive: 7 plays, 85 yards, 3:30.**
- DEN – Troy Franklin 3-yard pass from Bo Nix (Wil Lutz kick), 10:42. Broncos 14–13. **Drive: 7 plays, 67 yards, 3:30.**
- DEN – Adam Trautman 2-yard pass from Bo Nix (Wil Lutz kick), 3:03. Broncos 21–13. **Drive: 10 plays, 50 yards, 4:25.**
- IND – Jonathan Taylor 7-yard pass from Daniel Jones (Spencer Shrader kick), 1:31. Broncos 21–20. **Drive: 6 plays, 81 yards, 1:32.**

**Third quarter**

- DEN – J. K. Dobbins 5-yard run (Wil Lutz kick), 11:13. Broncos 28–20. **Drive: 7 plays, 60 yards, 3:47.**
- IND – Spencer Shrader 36-yard field goal, 5:42. Broncos 28–23. **Drive: 10 plays, 42 yards, 5:31.**

**Fourth quarter**

- IND – Spencer Shrader 28-yard field goal, 8:33. Broncos 28–26. **Drive: 7 plays, 81 yards, 2:52.**
- IND – Spencer Shrader 45-yard field goal, 0:00. Colts 29–28. **Drive: 9 plays, 41 yards, 3:15.**

**Top passers**

- DEN – Bo Nix – 22/30, 206 yards, 3 TD, INT
- IND – Daniel Jones – 23/34, 316 yards, TD

**Top rushers**

- DEN – J. K. Dobbins – 14 rushes, 76 yards, TD
- IND – Jonathan Taylor – 25 rushes, 165 yards

**Top receivers**

- DEN – Troy Franklin – 8 receptions, 89 yards, TD
- IND – Tyler Warren – 4 receptions, 79 yards

On the game's final play, kicker Spencer Shrader missed a 60-yard field goal with no time left. However, a 15-yard leverage penalty on Broncos' Dondrea Tillman moved the ball closer, and Shrader converted the ensuing 45-yard attempt. The Colts improved to 2–0 for the first time since 2009. They also became the first team in the Super Bowl era to not punt once in the first two weeks.

==== Week 3: at Tennessee Titans ====
Week 3: Indianapolis Colts at Tennessee Titans – Game summary

Quarter	1	2	3	4	Total
**Colts**	17	3	14	7	**41**
Titans	3	3	7	7	**20**

at Nissan Stadium, Nashville, Tennessee

- Date: September 21
- Game time: 1:00 p.m. EDT/12:00 p.m. CDT
- Game weather: Cloudy, 84 °F (29 °C)
- Game attendance: 56,361
- Referee: Scott Novak
- TV announcers (CBS): Tom McCarthy, Ross Tucker and Amanda Balionis
- Recap, Game Book

Game information

**First quarter**

- IND – Kenny Moore II 32-yard interception return (Spencer Shrader kick), 14:11. Colts 7–0.
- TEN – Joey Slye 57-yard field goal, 12:40. Colts 7–3. **Drive: 5 plays, 21 yards, 1:31.**
- IND – Spencer Shrader 24-yard field goal, 7:37. Colts 10–3. **Drive: 9 plays, 59 yards, 5:03.**
- IND – Jonathan Taylor 1-yard run (Spencer Shrader kick), 1:07. Colts 17–3. **Drive: 9 plays, 77 yards, 4:09.**

**Second quarter**

- TEN – Joey Slye 42-yard field goal, 10:50. Colts 17–6. **Drive: 11 plays, 54 yards, 5:17.**
- IND – Spencer Shrader 36-yard field goal, 0:00. Colts 20–6. **Drive: 5 plays, 30 yards, 0:37.**

**Third quarter**

- IND – Michael Pittman Jr. 20-yard pass from Daniel Jones (Spencer Shrader kick), 11:08. Colts 27–6. **Drive: 6 plays, 67 yards, 3:52.**
- TEN – Tony Pollard 1-yard run (Joey Slye kick), 5:09. Colts 27–13. **Drive: 13 plays, 73 yards, 5:59.**
- IND – Jonathan Taylor 46-yard run (Spencer Shrader kick), 1:27. Colts 34–13. **Drive: 7 plays, 80 yards, 3:42.**

**Fourth quarter**

- TEN – Elic Ayomanor 8-yard pass from Cam Ward (Joey Slye kick), 8:40. Colts 34–20. **Drive: 16 plays, 77 yards, 7:47.**
- IND – Jonathan Taylor 1-yard run (Spencer Shrader kick), 5:53. Colts 41–20. **Drive: 5 plays, 58 yards, 2:47.**

**Top passers**

- IND – Daniel Jones – 18/25, 228 yards, TD
- TEN – Cam Ward – 23/38, 219 yards, TD, INT

**Top rushers**

- IND – Jonathan Taylor – 17 rushes, 102 yards, 3 TD
- TEN – Tony Pollard – 16 rushes, 45 yards, TD

**Top receivers**

- IND – Michael Pittman Jr. – 6 receptions, 73 yards, TD
- TEN – Chig Okonkwo – 5 receptions, 66 yards

On the Colts' third drive of the game, they punted for the first time in the 2025 season, ending a streak of 20 consecutive drives without a punt. It was their only punt of the game, marking just one punt over the team's first three games of the season. This is the fewest punts by any team through the first three games of an NFL season since at least 1940. With the win (their fifth straight over the Titans), the Colts improve to 3–0.

==== Week 4: at Los Angeles Rams ====
Week 4: Indianapolis Colts at Los Angeles Rams – Game summary

Quarter	1	2	3	4	Total
Colts	3	7	0	10	**20**
**Rams**	3	10	0	14	**27**

at SoFi Stadium, Inglewood, California

- Date: September 28
- Game time: 4:05 p.m. EDT/1:05 p.m. PDT
- Game weather: Cloudy, 74 °F (23 °C) (fixed roof)
- Game attendance: 71,257
- Referee: Carl Cheffers
- TV announcers (Fox): Kevin Kugler, Daryl Johnston and Allison Williams
- Recap, Game Book

Game information

**First quarter**

- LAR – Joshua Karty 42-yard field goal, 7:32. Rams 3–0. **Drive: 11 plays, 57 yards, 5:15.**
- IND – Spencer Shrader 52-yard field goal, 4:55. Tied 3–3. **Drive: 5 plays, 18 yards, 2:37.**

**Second quarter**

- IND – Tyler Warren 2-yard run (Spencer Shrader kick), 12:17. Colts 10–3. **Drive: 9 plays, 45 yards, 5:07.**
- LAR – Joshua Karty 37-yard field goal, 5:21. Colts 10–6. **Drive: 11 plays, 57 yards, 6:56.**
- LAR – Davante Adams 10-yard pass from Matthew Stafford (Joshua Karty kick), 0:07. Rams 13–10. **Drive: 13 plays, 96 yards, 2:07.**

**Third quarter**

- No scoring plays

**Fourth quarter**

- IND – Michael Pittman Jr. 2-yard pass from Daniel Jones (Spencer Shrader kick), 11:34. Colts 17–13. **Drive: 11 plays, 90 yards, 6:07.**
- IND – Spencer Shrader 38-yard field goal, 8:58. Colts 20–13. **Drive: 4 plays, −3 yards, 2:24.**
- LAR – Puka Nacua 9-yard pass from Matthew Stafford (Joshua Karty kick), 3:20. Tied 20–20. **Drive: 11 plays, 83 yards, 5:38.**
- LAR – Tutu Atwell 88-yard pass from Matthew Stafford (Joshua Karty kick), 1:33. Rams 27–20. **Drive: 1 play, 88 yards, 0:11.**

**Top passers**

- IND – Daniel Jones – 24/33, 262 yards, TD, 2 INT
- LAR – Matthew Stafford – 29/41, 375 yards, 3 TD

**Top rushers**

- IND – Jonathan Taylor – 17 rushes, 76 yards
- LAR – Kyren Williams – 13 rushes, 77 yards

**Top receivers**

- IND – Adonai Mitchell – 3 receptions, 96 yards
- LAR – Puka Nacua – 13 receptions, 170 yards, TD

In the second half, WR Adonai Mitchell had what would have been a 76-yard touchdown, but he fumbled the ball before he crossed the goal line, which was one of 3 Colts turnovers during the game. He also had a holding penalty which prevented a 54-yard go-ahead touchdown run by Jonathan Taylor, which forced the Colts to punt and allowed the Rams to score a game-winning 88-yard touchdown with under two minutes left in the game. With their first loss of the season, the Colts fall to 3–1.

==== Week 5: vs. Las Vegas Raiders ====
Week 5: Las Vegas Raiders at Indianapolis Colts – Game summary

Quarter	1	2	3	4	Total
Raiders	3	0	0	3	**6**
**Colts**	0	20	20	0	**40**

at Lucas Oil Stadium, Indianapolis, Indiana

- Date: October 5
- Game time: 1:00 p.m. EDT
- Game weather: None (retractable roof closed)
- Game attendance: 64,955
- Referee: Alex Kemp
- TV announcers (Fox): Chris Myers and Brady Quinn
- Recap, Game Book

Game information

**First quarter**

- LV – Daniel Carlson 24-yard field goal, 3:21. Raiders 3–0. **Drive: 16 plays, 80 yards, 9:50.**

**Second quarter**

- IND – Tyler Warren 11-yard pass from Daniel Jones (Spencer Shrader kick), 11:33. Colts 7–3. **Drive: 13 plays, 83 yards, 6:48.**
- IND – Jonathan Taylor 3-yard run (Spencer Shrader kick), 7:56. Colts 14–3. **Drive: 4 plays, 8 yards, 1:33.**
- IND – Michael Pittman Jr. 4-yard pass from Daniel Jones (pass failed), 0:15. Colts 20–3. **Drive: 14 plays, 88 yards, 3:38.**

**Third quarter**

- IND – Jonathan Taylor 1-yard run (pass failed), 6:54. Colts 26–3. **Drive: 11 plays, 68 yards, 6:03.**
- IND – Ameer Abdullah 2-yard run (pass failed), 5:49. Colts 32–3. **Drive: 2 plays, 6 yards, 0:30.**
- IND – Jonathan Taylor 6-yard run (Jonathan Taylor run), 2:27. Colts 40–3. **Drive: 3 plays, 44 yards, 1:20.**

**Fourth quarter**

- LV – Daniel Carlson 37-yard field goal, 11:39. Colts 40–6. **Drive: 13 plays, 47 yards, 5:48.**

**Top passers**

- LV – Geno Smith – 25/36, 228 yards, 2 INT
- IND – Daniel Jones – 20/29, 212 yards, 2 TD

**Top rushers**

- LV – Ashton Jeanty – 14 rushes, 67 yards
- IND – Jonathan Taylor – 17 rushes, 66 yards, 3 TD

**Top receivers**

- LV – Tre Tucker – 4 receptions, 62 yards
- IND – Ashton Dulin – 2 receptions, 55 yards

The Raiders scored first and held a 3–0 lead at the end of the first quarter, but the remainder of the game was dominated by Indianapolis. The Colts defeated the Raiders in a blowout, winning by a 34-point margin. Running back Jonathan Taylor had a standout performance, recording three rushing touchdowns. The 34-point victory marked the Colts’ largest margin of victory since a 37–3 win over the Jacksonville Jaguars in 2013. Additionally, the Colts' offensive line did not allow a single sack, ending the Raiders' league-longest active streak of games with at least one sack. Indianapolis headed back to their winning ways, improving to 4–1 to start the year for the first time since 2013.

Following the game, it was revealed that kicker Spencer Shrader had suffered multiple torn ligaments and would miss the remainder of the season.

==== Week 6: vs. Arizona Cardinals ====
Week 6: Arizona Cardinals at Indianapolis Colts – Game summary

Quarter	1	2	3	4	Total
Cardinals	7	3	14	3	**27**
**Colts**	7	7	3	14	**31**

at Lucas Oil Stadium, Indianapolis, Indiana

- Date: October 12
- Game time: 1:00 p.m. EDT
- Game weather: Sunny, 57 °F (14 °C) (retractable roof open)
- Game attendance: 65,523
- Referee: Shawn Hochuli
- TV announcers (Fox): Kevin Kugler, Daryl Johnston and Allison Williams
- Recap, Game Book

Game information

**First quarter**

- IND – Tyler Warren 8-yard pass from Daniel Jones (Michael Badgley kick), 11:01. Colts 7–0. **Drive: 9 plays, 65 yards, 3:59.**
- ARI – Bam Knight 1-yard run (Chad Ryland kick), 1:42. Tied 7–7. **Drive: 11 plays, 56 yards, 6:12.**

**Second quarter**

- IND – Daniel Jones 3-yard run (Michael Badgley kick), 7:51. Colts 14–7. **Drive: 9 plays, 87 yards, 5:18.**
- ARI – Chad Ryland 40-yard field goal, 1:56. Colts 14–10. **Drive: 13 plays, 48 yards, 5:55.**

**Third quarter**

- ARI – Trey McBride 1-yard pass from Jacoby Brissett (Chad Ryland kick), 8:39. Cardinals 17–14. **Drive: 10 plays, 61 yards, 6:21.**
- IND – Michael Badgley 45-yard field goal, 4:31. Tied 17–17. **Drive: 9 plays, 42 yards, 4:08.**
- ARI – Greg Dortch 12-yard pass from Jacoby Brissett (Chad Ryland kick), 1:22. Cardinals 24–17. **Drive: 6 plays, 66 yards, 3:09.**

**Fourth quarter**

- IND – Josh Downs 5-yard pass from Daniel Jones (Michael Badgley kick), 13:12. Tied 24–24. **Drive: 6 plays, 67 yards, 3:10.**
- ARI – Chad Ryland 44-yard field goal, 9:31. Cardinals 27–24. **Drive: 9 plays, 34 yards, 3:41.**
- IND – Jonathan Taylor 1-yard run (Michael Badgley kick), 4:32. Colts 31–27. **Drive: 9 plays, 66 yards, 4:59.**

**Top passers**

- ARI – Jacoby Brissett – 27/44, 320 yards, 2 TD, INT
- IND – Daniel Jones – 22/30, 212 yards, 2 TD, INT

**Top rushers**

- ARI – Bam Knight – 11 rushes, 34 yards, TD
- IND – Jonathan Taylor – 21 rushes, 123 yards, TD

**Top receivers**

- ARI – Zay Jones – 5 receptions, 79 yards
- IND – Tyler Warren – 6 receptions, 63 yards, TD

With the win, the Colts improved to 5–1 for the first time since 2009.

==== Week 7: at Los Angeles Chargers ====
Week 7: Indianapolis Colts at Los Angeles Chargers – Game summary

Quarter	1	2	3	4	Total
**Colts**	6	17	15	0	**38**
Chargers	3	0	14	7	**24**

at SoFi Stadium, Inglewood, California

- Date: October 19
- Game time: 4:05 p.m. EDT/1:05 p.m. PDT
- Game weather: Sunny, 79 °F (26 °C) (fixed roof)
- Game attendance: 71,124
- Referee: Alan Eck
- TV announcers (CBS): Ian Eagle, J. J. Watt and Evan Washburn
- Recap, Game Book

Game information

**First quarter**

- IND – Jonathan Taylor 23-yard run (kick failed), 12:36. Colts 6–0. **Drive: 5 plays, 75 yards, 2:24.**
- LAC – Cameron Dicker 43-yard field goal, 7:35. Colts 6–3. **Drive: 9 plays, 44 yards, 5:01.**

**Second quarter**

- IND – Michael Pittman Jr. 4-yard pass from Daniel Jones (Michael Badgley kick), 14:54. Colts 13–3. **Drive: 17 plays, 70 yards, 7:41.**
- IND – Tyler Warren 5-yard pass from Daniel Jones (Michael Badgley kick), 8:56. Colts 20–3. **Drive: 8 plays, 80 yards, 4:34.**
- IND – Michael Badgley 36-yard field goal, 0:00. Colts 23–3. **Drive: 9 plays, 62 yards, 1:54.**

**Third quarter**

- LAC – Quentin Johnston 7-yard pass from Justin Herbert (Cameron Dicker kick), 13:01. Colts 23–10. **Drive: 6 plays, 70 yards, 1:59.**
- IND – Jonathan Taylor 8-yard run (Daniel Jones–Michael Pittman Jr. pass), 12:03. Colts 31–10. **Drive: 2 plays, 14 yards, 0:58.**
- LAC – Keenan Allen 4-yard pass from Justin Herbert (Cameron Dicker kick), 6:13. Colts 31–17. **Drive: 10 plays, 76 yards, 5:50.**
- IND – Jonathan Taylor 19-yard run (Michael Badgley kick), 3:33. Colts 38–17. **Drive: 5 plays, 73 yards, 2:40.**

**Fourth quarter**

- LAC – Oronde Gadsden II 15-yard pass from Justin Herbert (Cameron Dicker kick), 13:40. Colts 38–24. **Drive: 11 plays, 76 yards, 4:53.**

**Top passers**

- IND – Daniel Jones – 23/34, 288 yards, 2 TD
- LAC – Justin Herbert – 37/55, 420 yards, 3 TD, 2 INT

**Top rushers**

- IND – Jonathan Taylor – 16 rushes, 94 yards, 3 TD
- LAC – Justin Herbert – 6 rushes, 31 yards

**Top receivers**

- IND – Alec Pierce – 5 receptions, 98 yards
- LAC – Oronde Gadsden II – 7 receptions, 164 yards, TD

The Colts scored five total touchdowns in the game, with Michael Pittman Jr. and Tyler Warren each recording one, and Jonathan Taylor rushing for three scores. Defensively, the Colts intercepted Chargers quarterback Justin Herbert twice.

With their first win over the Chargers since the 2016 season, the Colts improved to 6–1. They also recorded their first road win in Los Angeles since 1986, when they defeated the then–Los Angeles Raiders.

==== Week 8: vs. Tennessee Titans ====
Week 8: Tennessee Titans at Indianapolis Colts – Game summary

Quarter	1	2	3	4	Total
Titans	0	7	0	7	**14**
**Colts**	10	7	14	7	**38**

at Lucas Oil Stadium, Indianapolis, Indiana

- Date: October 26
- Game time: 4:25 p.m. EDT
- Game weather: None (retractable roof closed)
- Game attendance: 65,816
- Referee: Land Clark
- TV announcers (CBS): Andrew Catalon, Charles Davis, Jason McCourty and AJ Ross
- Recap, Game Book

Game information

**First quarter**

- IND – Michael Badgley 43-yard field goal, 9:43. Colts 3–0. **Drive: 10 plays, 53 yards, 5:17.**
- IND – Jonathan Taylor 18-yard run (Michael Badgley kick), 0:09. Colts 10–0. **Drive: 8 plays, 73 yards, 4:54.**

**Second quarter**

- TEN – Gunnar Helm 1-yard pass from Cam Ward (Joey Slye kick), 11:14. Colts 10–7. **Drive: 6 plays, 69 yards, 3:55.**
- IND – Michael Pittman Jr. 21-yard pass from Daniel Jones (Michael Badgley kick), 7:44. Colts 17–7. **Drive: 6 plays, 71 yards, 3:30.**

**Third quarter**

- IND – Jonathan Taylor 80-yard run (Michael Badgley kick), 11:10. Colts 24–7. **Drive: 1 play, 80 yards, 0:12.**
- IND – Josh Downs 10-yard pass from Daniel Jones (Michael Badgley kick), 5:12. Colts 31–7. **Drive: 8 plays, 74 yards, 4:26.**

**Fourth quarter**

- IND – Jonathan Taylor 19-yard pass from Daniel Jones (Michael Badgley kick), 14:22. Colts 38–7. **Drive: 6 plays, 46 yards, 2:14.**
- TEN – Tyjae Spears 3-yard run (Joey Slye kick), 2:36. Colts 38–14. **Drive: 8 plays, 67 yards, 2:54.**

**Top passers**

- TEN – Cam Ward – 22/38, 259 yards, TD, INT
- IND – Daniel Jones – 21/29, 272 yards, 3 TD

**Top rushers**

- TEN – Tyjae Spears – 9 rushes, 59 yards, TD
- IND – Jonathan Taylor – 12 rushes, 153 yards, 2 TD

**Top receivers**

- TEN – Chimere Dike – 7 receptions, 93 yards
- IND – Michael Pittman Jr. – 8 receptions, 95 yards, TD

Jonathan Taylor once again dominated the Titans, rushing for 153 yards on 12 carries and scoring three touchdowns. With that performance, Taylor became the first player in NFL history to record three touchdowns in three consecutive games against the same opponent.

With the win, the Colts improved to 7–1. It marked the team's sixth straight win over Tennessee, as well as their third consecutive season sweep.

==== Week 9: at Pittsburgh Steelers ====
Week 9: Indianapolis Colts at Pittsburgh Steelers – Game summary

Quarter	1	2	3	4	Total
Colts	7	0	0	13	**20**
**Steelers**	0	17	0	10	**27**

at Acrisure Stadium, Pittsburgh, Pennsylvania

- Date: November 2
- Game time: 1:00 p.m. EST
- Game weather: Cloudy, 56 °F (13 °C)
- Game attendance: 66,677
- Referee: Craig Wrolstad
- TV announcers (CBS): Ian Eagle, J. J. Watt and Evan Washburn
- Recap, Game Book

Game information

**First quarter**

- IND – Daniel Jones 1-yard run (Michael Badgley kick), 8:05. Colts 7–0. **Drive: 13 plays, 79 yards, 5:16.**

**Second quarter**

- PIT – Jaylen Warren 1-yard run (Chris Boswell kick), 6:09. Tied 7–7. **Drive: 12 plays, 56 yards, 5:12.**
- PIT – Pat Freiermuth 12-yard pass from Aaron Rodgers (Chris Boswell kick), 4:22. Steelers 14–7. **Drive: 2 plays, 14 yards, 0:50.**
- PIT – Chris Boswell 25-yard field goal, 0:00. Steelers 17–7. **Drive: 12 plays, 75 yards, 3:19.**

**Third quarter**

- No scoring plays

**Fourth quarter**

- PIT – Jaylen Warren 2-yard run (Chris Boswell kick), 14:16. Steelers 24–7. **Drive: 7 plays, 56 yards, 3:53.**
- IND – Michael Badgley 52-yard field goal, 10:45. Steelers 24–10. **Drive: 8 plays, 42 yards, 3:31.**
- PIT – Chris Boswell 46-yard field goal, 6:51. Steelers 27–10. **Drive: 6 plays, 6 yards, 1:07.**
- IND – Josh Downs 4-yard pass from Daniel Jones (Michael Badgley kick), 4:30. Steelers 27–17. **Drive: 9 plays, 76 yards, 2:21.**
- IND – Michael Badgley 53-yard field goal, 0:09. Steelers 27–20. **Drive: 7 plays, 53 yards, 0:52.**

**Top passers**

- IND – Daniel Jones – 31/50, 342 yards, TD, 3 INT
- PIT – Aaron Rodgers – 25/35, 203 yards, TD

**Top rushers**

- IND – Jonathan Taylor – 14 rushes, 45 yards
- PIT – Jaylen Warren – 16 rushes, 31 yards, 2 TD

**Top receivers**

- IND – Michael Pittman Jr. – 9 receptions, 115 yards
- PIT – Calvin Austin III – 5 receptions, 56 yards

The Colts' top-ranked offense struggled against the Pittsburgh Steelers' defense. Pittsburgh forced six turnovers and sacked Daniel Jones five times. The Colts’ 20 points tied a season low, and Jonathan Taylor was held to a season-low 45 yards on 14 carries. With the upset loss, the Colts dropped to 7–2 and extended their losing streak in Pittsburgh to five games. They once again failed to win in Pittsburgh, not having done so since 2008.

==== Week 10: vs. Atlanta Falcons ====
NFL International Series

Week 10: Atlanta Falcons at Indianapolis Colts – Game summary

Quarter	1	2	3	4	OT	Total
Falcons	7	7	3	8	0	**25**
**Colts**	13	0	0	12	6	**31**

at Olympiastadion, Berlin, Germany

- Date: November 9
- Game time: 3:30 p.m. CET/9:30 a.m. EST
- Game weather: Cloudy, 46 °F (8 °C)
- Game attendance: 72,203
- Referee: Clete Blakeman
- TV announcers (WXIN/NFLN): Adam Amin, Kurt Warner, Kristina Pink and Stacey Dales
- Recap, Game Book

Game information

**First quarter**

- IND – Jonathan Taylor 1-yard run (kick failed), 8:36. Colts 6–0. **Drive: 2 plays, 23 yards, 0:39.**
- ATL – Tyler Allgeier 1-yard run (Zane Gonzalez kick), 6:07. Falcons 7–6. **Drive: 5 plays, 81 yards, 2:29.**
- IND – Alec Pierce 37-yard pass from Daniel Jones (Michael Badgley kick), 5:19. Colts 13–7. **Drive: 2 plays, 65 yards, 0:48.**

**Second quarter**

- ATL – Drake London 16-yard pass from Michael Penix Jr. (Zane Gonzalez kick), 3:25. Falcons 14–13. **Drive: 6 plays, 55 yards, 3:29.**

**Third quarter**

- ATL – Zane Gonzalez 43-yard field goal, 12:26. Falcons 17–13. **Drive: 7 plays, 44 yards, 2:34.**

**Fourth quarter**

- IND – Michael Badgley 34-yard field goal, 9:00. Falcons 17–16. **Drive: 9 plays, 31 yards, 5:28.**
- IND – Jonathan Taylor 83-yard run (pass failed), 6:02. Colts 22–17. **Drive: 2 plays, 91 yards, 0:53.**
- ATL – Tyler Allgeier 1-yard run (Michael Penix Jr–Drake London pass), 1:44. Falcons 25–22. **Drive: 9 plays, 71 yards, 4:18.**
- IND – Michael Badgley 44-yard field goal, 0:25. Tied 25–25. **Drive: 8 plays, 22 yards, 1:19.**

**Overtime**

- IND – Jonathan Taylor 8-yard run, 3:31. Colts 31–25. **Drive: 7 plays, 57 yards, 3:58.**

**Top passers**

- ATL – Michael Penix Jr. – 12/28, 177 yards, TD
- IND – Daniel Jones – 19/26, 255 yards, TD, INT

**Top rushers**

- ATL – Bijan Robinson – 17 rushes, 84 yards
- IND – Jonathan Taylor – 32 rushes, 244 yards, 3 TD

**Top receivers**

- ATL – Drake London – 6 receptions, 104 yards, TD
- IND – Tyler Warren – 8 receptions, 99 yards

The Colts participated in the first NFL regular-season game held in Berlin, Germany. Jonathan Taylor delivered another standout performance, recording 244 rushing yards and three touchdowns, including an 83-yard touchdown run, the longest run of the NFL season, and an 8-yard rushing touchdown in overtime that secured the victory for the Colts. With the overtime win, the Colts matched their 2024 win total and moved into a tie with the Denver Broncos and New England Patriots for the best record in the NFL at 8–2.

Taylor's 83-yard touchdown run moved him past Hall of Famer Edgerrin James for the most rushing touchdowns (65) in Colts franchise history.

==== Week 12: at Kansas City Chiefs ====
Week 12: Indianapolis Colts at Kansas City Chiefs – Game summary

Quarter	1	2	3	4	OT	Total
Colts	7	7	6	0	0	**20**
**Chiefs**	0	9	0	11	3	**23**

at Arrowhead Stadium, Kansas City, Missouri

- Date: November 23
- Game time: 1:00 p.m. EST/12:00 p.m. CST
- Game weather: Fair, 46 °F (8 °C)
- Game attendance: 73,611
- Referee: Alex Moore
- TV announcers (CBS): Jim Nantz, Tony Romo and Tracy Wolfson
- Recap, Game Book

Game information

**First quarter**

- IND – Michael Pittman Jr. 6-yard pass from Daniel Jones (Michael Badgley kick), 8:11. Colts 7–0. **Drive: 2 plays, 3 yards, 0:43.**

**Second quarter**

- KC – Harrison Butker 28-yard field goal, 14:51. Colts 7–3. **Drive: 17 plays, 64 yards, 8:20.**
- IND – Drew Ogletree 4-yard pass from Daniel Jones (Michael Badgley kick), 10:31. Colts 14–3. **Drive: 8 plays, 75 yards, 4:20.**
- KC – Harrison Butker 48-yard field goal, 2:19. Colts 14–6. **Drive: 13 plays, 48 yards, 8:12.**
- KC – Harrison Butker 22-yard field goal, 0:07. Colts 14–9. **Drive: 10 plays, 81 yards, 1:34.**

**Third quarter**

- IND – Michael Badgley 32-yard field goal, 9:12. Colts 17–9. **Drive: 8 plays, 49 yards, 4:03.**
- IND – Michael Badgley 23-yard field goal, 1:26. Colts 20–9. **Drive: 11 plays, 69 yards, 4:49.**

**Fourth quarter**

- KC – Kareem Hunt 2-yard run (Patrick Mahomes–Rashee Rice pass), 8:37. Colts 20–17. **Drive: 11 plays, 56 yards, 5:09.**
- KC – Harrison Butker 25-yard field goal, 0:00. Tied 20–20. **Drive: 15 plays, 87 yards, 4:43.**

**Overtime**

- KC – Harrison Butker 27-yard field goal, 1:57. Chiefs 23–20. **Drive: 12 plays, 81 yards, 5:56.**

**Top passers**

- IND – Daniel Jones – 19/31, 181 yards, 2 TD
- KC – Patrick Mahomes – 29/46, 352 yards, INT

**Top rushers**

- IND – Jonathan Taylor – 16 rushes, 58 yards
- KC – Kareem Hunt – 30 rushes, 104 yards, TD

**Top receivers**

- IND – Ashton Dulin – 1 reception, 48 yards
- KC – Rashee Rice – 8 receptions, 141 yards

The Colts' rushing attack was limited, as Jonathan Taylor was held to 58 yards on 16 carries. Although the Colts led 20–9 entering the fourth quarter, the Chiefs rallied. Kansas City's defense forced the Colts to go three-and-out on each of their final four possessions, and the Chiefs eventually kicked the game-winning field goal in overtime. Kansas City defeated the Colts at Arrowhead Stadium in the regular season for the first time since 2004. Additionally, Patrick Mahomes recorded his first career regular season win against the Colts after previously going 0–2. With their first loss to Kansas City since 2018, the Colts fell to 8–3 and finished 3–1 against the AFC West.

==== Week 13: vs. Houston Texans ====
Week 13: Houston Texans at Indianapolis Colts – Game summary

Quarter	1	2	3	4	Total
**Texans**	3	7	3	7	**20**
Colts	0	6	7	3	**16**

at Lucas Oil Stadium, Indianapolis, Indiana

- Date: November 30
- Game time: 1:00 p.m. EST
- Game weather: None (retractable roof closed)
- Game attendance: 65,977
- Referee: Clay Martin
- TV announcers (CBS): Ian Eagle, J. J. Watt and Evan Washburn
- Recap, Game Book

Game information

**First quarter**

- HOU – Ka'imi Fairbairn 23-yard field goal, 7:55. Texans 3–0. **Drive: 13 plays, 64 yards, 6:12.**

**Second quarter**

- IND – Alec Pierce 19-yard pass from Daniel Jones (kick failed), 8:41. Colts 6–3. **Drive: 3 plays, 42 yards, 1:24.**
- HOU – Nick Chubb 4-yard run (Ka'imi Fairbairn kick), 5:08. Texans 10–6. **Drive: 8 plays, 67 yards, 3:33.**

**Third quarter**

- HOU – Ka'imi Fairbairn 43-yard field goal, 6:47. Texans 13–6. **Drive: 14 plays, 48 yards, 8:13.**
- IND – Tyler Warren 12-yard pass from Daniel Jones (Michael Badgley kick), 2:51. Tied 13–13. **Drive: 9 plays, 79 yards, 3:56.**

**Fourth quarter**

- HOU – Nico Collins 7-yard run (Ka'imi Fairbairn kick), 12:38. Texans 20–13. **Drive: 12 plays, 65 yards, 5:13.**
- IND – Michael Badgley 42-yard field goal, 8:40. Texans 20–16. **Drive: 8 plays, 41 yards, 3:58.**

**Top passers**

- HOU – C. J. Stroud – 22/35, 276 yards, INT
- IND – Daniel Jones – 14/27, 201 yards, 2 TD

**Top rushers**

- HOU – Woody Marks – 19 rushes, 64 yards
- IND – Jonathan Taylor – 21 rushes, 85 yards

**Top receivers**

- HOU – Nico Collins – 5 receptions, 98 yards
- IND – Alec Pierce – 4 receptions, 78 yards, TD

The Colts suffered their first home loss of the season.

==== Week 14: at Jacksonville Jaguars ====
Week 14: Indianapolis Colts at Jacksonville Jaguars – Game summary

Quarter	1	2	3	4	Total
Colts	7	3	3	6	**19**
**Jaguars**	14	14	0	8	**36**

at EverBank Stadium, Jacksonville, Florida

- Date: December 7
- Game time: 1:00 p.m. EST
- Game weather: Cloudy, 61 °F (16 °C)
- Game attendance: 60,067
- Referee: John Hussey
- TV announcers (CBS): Ian Eagle, J. J. Watt and Evan Washburn
- Recap, Game Book

Game information

**First quarter**

- JAX – Travis Etienne 3-yard run (Cam Little kick), 10:39. Jaguars 7–0. **Drive: 4 plays, 21 yards, 2:15.**
- IND – Jonathan Taylor 1-yard run (Blake Grupe kick), 4:32. Tied 7–7. **Drive: 11 plays, 76 yards, 6:07.**
- JAX – Jakobi Meyers 14-yard pass from Trevor Lawrence (Cam Little kick), 2:27. Jaguars 14–7. **Drive: 5 plays, 74 yards, 2:05.**

**Second quarter**

- JAX – Travis Etienne 28-yard run (Cam Little kick), 12:52. Jaguars 21–7. **Drive: 1 play, 28 yards, 0:07.**
- IND – Blake Grupe 28-yard field goal, 4:54. Jaguars 21–10. **Drive: 16 plays, 64 yards, 7:58.**
- JAX – Tim Patrick 8-yard pass from Trevor Lawrence (Cam Little kick), 0:07. Jaguars 28–10. **Drive: 12 plays, 55 yards, 1:38.**

**Third quarter**

- IND – Blake Grupe 36-yard field goal, 9:57. Jaguars 28–13. **Drive: 8 plays, 56 yards, 5:03.**

**Fourth quarter**

- JAX – Cam Little 35-yard field goal, 14:05. Jaguars 31–13. **Drive: 12 plays, 59 yards, 7:41.**
- JAX – Riley Leonard sacked in the endzone by Josh Hines-Allen for a safety, 6:57. Jaguars 33–13.
- JAX – Cam Little 48-yard field goal, 4:41. Jaguars 36–13. **Drive: 4 plays, 2 yards, 2:16.**
- IND – Riley Leonard 6-yard run (pass failed), 1:51. Jaguars 36–19. **Drive: 12 plays, 65 yards, 2:50.**

**Top passers**

- IND – Riley Leonard – 18/29, 145 yards, INT
- JAX – Trevor Lawrence – 17/30, 244 yards, 2 TD

**Top rushers**

- IND – Jonathan Taylor – 21 rushes, 74 yards, TD
- JAX – Travis Etienne – 20 rushes, 74 yards, 2 TD

**Top receivers**

- IND – Alec Pierce – 5 receptions, 80 yards
- JAX – Brian Thomas Jr. – 3 receptions, 87 yards

Near the end of the first quarter, Daniel Jones suffered an Achilles injury that forced him out for the remainder of the game. Without Jones, the Colts struggled yet again against the Jaguars, losing their third straight game. The loss dropped their record to 8–5 overall, 2–2 against the AFC South, and extended their losing streak in Jacksonville to 11 games.

The next day, it was revealed that Jones had torn his right Achilles tendon and would miss the remainder of the season.

==== Week 15: at Seattle Seahawks ====
Week 15: Indianapolis Colts at Seattle Seahawks – Game summary

Quarter	1	2	3	4	Total
Colts	3	10	0	3	**16**
**Seahawks**	3	3	3	9	**18**

at Lumen Field, Seattle, Washington

- Date: December 14
- Game time: 4:25 p.m. EST/1:25 p.m. PST
- Game weather: Cloudy, 51 °F (11 °C)
- Game attendance: 68,771
- Referee: Adrian Hill
- TV announcers (CBS): Andrew Catalon, Charles Davis, Jason McCourty and AJ Ross
- Recap, Game Book

Game information

**First quarter**

- IND – Blake Grupe 42-yard field goal, 3:40. Colts 3–0. **Drive: 11 plays, 41 yards, 5:17.**
- SEA – Jason Myers 47-yard field goal, 0:50. Tied 3–3. **Drive: 6 plays, 34 yards, 2:50.**

**Second quarter**

- IND – Blake Grupe 54-yard field goal, 8:26. Colts 6–3. **Drive: 6 plays, 17 yards, 4:26.**
- IND – Josh Downs 8-yard pass from Philip Rivers (Blake Grupe kick), 1:33. Colts 13–3. **Drive: 10 plays, 58 yards, 4:16.**
- SEA – Jason Myers 52-yard field goal, 0:00. Colts 13–6. **Drive: 9 plays, 44 yards, 1:33.**

**Third quarter**

- SEA – Jason Myers 46-yard field goal, 9:49. Colts 13–9. **Drive: 11 plays, 43 yards, 5:11.**

**Fourth quarter**

- SEA – Jason Myers 32-yard field goal, 13:24. Colts 13–12. **Drive: 8 plays, 66 yards, 4:10.**
- SEA – Jason Myers 30-yard field goal, 2:27. Seahawks 15–13. **Drive: 11 plays, 82 yards, 5:42.**
- IND – Blake Grupe 60-yard field goal, 0:47. Colts 16–15. **Drive: 7 plays, 26 yards, 1:40.**
- SEA – Jason Myers 56-yard field goal, 0:18. Seahawks 18–16. **Drive: 5 plays, 25 yards, 0:29.**

**Top passers**

- IND – Philip Rivers – 18/27, 120 yards, TD, INT
- SEA – Sam Darnold – 22/36, 271 yards

**Top rushers**

- IND – Jonathan Taylor – 25 rushes, 87 yards
- SEA – Zach Charbonnet – 8 rushes, 31 yards

**Top receivers**

- IND – Ameer Abdullah – 5 receptions, 32 yards
- SEA – Jaxon Smith-Njigba – 7 receptions, 113 yards

With Daniel Jones out for the season and backup quarterbacks Anthony Richardson and Riley Leonard injured, the Colts announced that 44-year-old Philip Rivers, who had not played in the NFL since the 2020 season and had signed with the practice squad earlier in the week, would start against the Seahawks.

Although the Colts kept the game much closer than expected, allowing no touchdowns by the Seahawks, and had the lead with a 60-yard field goal with 47 seconds left by Blake Grupe, a Colts franchise record, they ultimately lost as Seattle kicker Jason Myers converted six field goals, including a game-winning 56-yard field goal with 18 seconds remaining, and Seahawks safety Coby Bryant intercepted a pass from Rivers on the ensuing drive to seal Seattle's victory. Rivers finished 18-of-27 for 120 yards and one touchdown, his first since the Colts’ Wild Card playoff game against the Bills.

==== Week 16: vs. San Francisco 49ers ====
Week 16: San Francisco 49ers at Indianapolis Colts – Game summary

Quarter	1	2	3	4	Total
**49ers**	14	10	10	14	**48**
Colts	7	10	3	7	**27**

at Lucas Oil Stadium, Indianapolis, Indiana

- Date: December 22
- Game time: 8:15 p.m. EST
- Game weather: None (retractable roof closed)
- Game attendance: 66,265
- Referee: Ron Torbert
- TV announcers (ESPN/ABC/Disney+): Joe Buck, Troy Aikman, Lisa Salters and Laura Rutledge
- Recap, Game Book

Game information

**First quarter**

- IND – Alec Pierce 20-yard pass from Philip Rivers (Blake Grupe kick), 10:31. Colts 7–0. **Drive: 9 plays, 72 yards, 4:29.**
- SF – Demarcus Robinson 22-yard pass from Brock Purdy (Eddy Pineiro kick), 7:14. Tied 7–7. **Drive: 6 plays, 69 yards, 3:17.**
- SF – Christian McCaffrey 2-yard pass from Brock Purdy (Eddy Pineiro kick), 4:33. 49ers 14–7. **Drive: 5 plays, 26 yards, 2:35.**

**Second quarter**

- IND – Alec Pierce 16-yard pass from Philip Rivers (Blake Grupe kick), 14:15. Tied 14–14. **Drive: 12 plays, 66 yards, 5:18.'**
- SF – George Kittle 11-yard pass from Brock Purdy (Eddy Pineiro kick), 9:36. 49ers 21–14. **Drive: 10 plays, 69 yards, 4:39.**
- SF – Eddy Pineiro 25-yard field goal, 1:51. 49ers 24–14. **Drive: 12 plays, 75 yards, 5:18.**
- IND – Blake Grupe 39-yard field goal, 0:17. 49ers 24–17. **Drive: 7 plays, 44 yards, 1:34.**

**Third quarter**

- SF – Jauan Jennings 3-yard pass from Brock Purdy (Eddy Pineiro kick), 10:58. 49ers 31–17. **Drive: 8 plays, 64 yards, 4:02.**
- IND – Blake Grupe 51-yard field goal, 8:16. 49ers 31–20. **Drive: 7 plays, 33 yards, 2:42.**
- SF – Eddy Pineiro 38-yard field goal, 4:02. 49ers 34–20. **Drive: 8 plays, 49 yards, 4:14.**

**Fourth quarter**

- IND – Jonathan Taylor 1-yard run (Blake Grupe kick), 12:41. 49ers 34–27. **Drive: 12 plays, 65 yards, 6:21.**
- SF – Christian McCaffrey 9-yard pass from Brock Purdy (Eddy Pineiro kick), 7:37. 49ers 41–27. **Drive: 10 plays, 70 yards, 5:04.**
- SF – Dee Winters 74-yard interception return (Eddy Pineiro kick), 3:26. **49ers 48–27.**

**Top passers**

- SF – Brock Purdy – 25/34, 295 yards, 5 TD, INT
- IND – Philip Rivers – 23/35, 277 yards, 2 TD, INT

**Top rushers**

- SF – Christian McCaffrey – 21 rushes, 117 yards
- IND – Jonathan Taylor – 16 rushes, 46 yards, TD

**Top receivers**

- SF – George Kittle – 7 receptions, 115 yards, TD
- IND – Alec Pierce – 4 receptions, 86 yards, 2 TD

The 49ers’ offense dominated the Colts’ defense. 49ers quarterback Brock Purdy completed 25-of-34 passes for 295 yards as San Francisco totaled 440 yards of offense. 49ers running back Christian McCaffrey rushed 21 times for 117 yards and added six receptions for 29 yards and two touchdowns. 49ers tight end George Kittle recorded seven receptions for 115 yards and one touchdown, and the team did not punt at any point during a blowout loss for the Colts.

This was the first game in which the Colts did not force a punt since a 2007 matchup against the Jaguars. Additionally, the Colts lost to the 49ers for the first time since the 2001 season.

==== Week 17: vs. Jacksonville Jaguars ====
Week 17: Jacksonville Jaguars at Indianapolis Colts – Game summary

Quarter	1	2	3	4	Total
**Jaguars**	0	7	10	6	**23**
Colts	3	7	7	0	**17**

at Lucas Oil Stadium, Indianapolis, Indiana

- Date: December 28
- Game time: 1:00 p.m. EST
- Game weather: None (retractable roof closed)
- Game attendance: 66,080
- Referee: Brad Allen
- TV announcers (Fox): Joe Davis, Greg Olsen and Pam Oliver
- Recap, Game Book

Game information

**First quarter**

- IND – Blake Grupe 33-yard field goal, 11:14. Colts 3–0. **Drive: 8 plays, 29 yards, 3:46.**

**Second quarter**

- IND – Jonathan Taylor 3-yard run (Blake Grupe kick), 12:49. Colts 10–0. **Drive: 15 plays, 83 yards, 8:17.**
- JAX – Trevor Lawrence 4-yard run (Cam Little kick), 5:38. Colts 10–7. **Drive: 12 plays, 69 yards, 7:11.**

**Third quarter**

- JAX – Trevor Lawrence 6-yard run (Cam Little kick), 7:26. Jaguars 14–10. **Drive: 8 plays, 81 yards, 2:42.**
- IND – Mo Alie-Cox 5-yard pass from Philip Rivers (Blake Grupe kick), 5:58. Colts 17–14. **Drive: 8 plays, 81 yards, 2:42.**
- JAX – Cam Little 34-yard field goal, 1:25. Tied 17–17. **Drive: 10 plays, 51 yards, 4:33.**

**Fourth quarter**

- JAX – Cam Little 42-yard field goal, 6:58. Jaguars 20–17. **Drive: 4 plays, -3 yards, 0:56.**
- JAX – Cam Little 53-yard field goal, 0:18. Jaguars 23–17. **Drive: 8 plays, 13 yards, 2:48.**

**Top passers**

- JAX – Trevor Lawrence – 23/37, 263 yards, INT
- IND – Philip Rivers – 17/30, 147 yards, TD, INT

**Top rushers**

- JAX – Travis Etienne – 17 rushes, 76 yards
- IND – Jonathan Taylor – 21 rushes, 70 yards, TD

**Top receivers**

- JAX – Parker Washington – 8 receptions, 115 yards
- IND – Tyler Warren – 5 receptions, 43 yards

Following the Texans’ win over the Chargers on Saturday, the Colts were eliminated from playoff contention. The Colts became the sixth team since 1970, and the first since the 1995 Oakland Raiders, to miss the postseason after starting 8–2.

With the loss, the Colts fell to 8–8 (2–3 against the AFC South) and finished 6–3 at home.

==== Week 18: at Houston Texans ====
Week 18: Indianapolis Colts at Houston Texans – Game summary

Quarter	1	2	3	4	Total
Colts	10	7	10	3	**30**
**Texans**	6	17	3	12	**38**

at NRG Stadium, Houston, Texas

- Date: January 4
- Game time: 1:00 p.m. EST/12:00 p.m. CST
- Game weather: None (retractable roof closed)
- Game attendance: 71,133
- Referee: Land Clark
- TV announcers (CBS): Ian Eagle, J. J. Watt and Evan Washburn
- Recap, Game Book

Game information

**First quarter**

- HOU – Ka'imi Fairbairn 51-yard field goal, 12:05. Texans 3–0. **Drive: 8 plays, 37 yards, 2:55.**
- IND – Alec Pierce 66-yard pass from Riley Leonard (Blake Grupe kick), 10:36. Colts 7–3. **Drive: 3 plays, 69 yards, 1:29.**
- HOU – Ka'imi Fairbairn 48-yard field goal, 6:36. Colts 7–6. **Drive: 7 plays, 31 yards, 4:00.**
- IND – Blake Grupe 50-yard field goal, 0:34. Colts 10–6. **Drive: 11 plays, 44 yards, 6:02.**

**Second quarter**

- HOU – Jayden Higgins 11-yard pass from C. J. Stroud (Ka'imi Fairbairn kick), 9:34. Texans 13–10. **Drive: 11 plays, 82 yards, 6:00.**
- HOU – C. J. Stroud 2-yard run (Ka'imi Fairbairn kick), 8:32. Texans 20–10. **Drive: 1 play, 2 yards, 0:06.**
- IND – Alec Pierce 8-yard pass from Riley Leonard (Blake Grupe kick), 1:25. Texans 20–17. **Drive: 8 plays, 92 yards, 2:34.**
- HOU – Ka'imi Fairbairn 29-yard field goal, 0:00. Texans 23–17. **Drive: 9 plays, 59 yards, 1:25.**

**Third quarter**

- IND – Riley Leonard 1-yard run (Blake Grupe kick), 13:05. Colts 24–23. **Drive: 4 plays, 65 yards, 1:55.**
- HOU – Ka'imi Fairbairn 43-yard field goal, 6:53. Texans 26–24. **Drive: 8 plays, 47 yards, 3:26.**
- IND – Blake Grupe 39-yard field goal, 1:42. Colts 27–26. **Drive: 13 plays, 44 yards, 5:11.**

**Fourth quarter**

- HOU – Ka'imi Fairbairn 44-yard field goal, 11:15. Texans 29–27. **Drive: 4 plays, 8 yards, 1:13.**
- IND – Blake Grupe 22-yard field goal, 2:39. Colts 30–29. **Drive: 14 plays, 61 yards, 8:36.**
- HOU – Ka'imi Fairbairn 43-yard field goal, 0:12. Texans 32–30. **Drive: 7 plays, 40 yards, 2:27.**
- HOU – Tommy Togiai 17-yard fumble recovery, 0:00. Texans 38–30.

**Top passers**

- IND – Riley Leonard – 21/34, 270 yards, 2 TD, INT
- HOU – C. J. Stroud – 14/23, 169 yards, TD

**Top rushers**

- IND – DJ Giddens – 8 rushes, 30 yards
- HOU – British Brooks – 13 rushes, 63 yards

**Top receivers**

- IND – Alec Pierce – 4 receptions, 132 yards, 2 TD
- HOU – Xavier Hutchinson – 5 receptions, 84 yards

With their fifth straight loss to the Texans, the Colts finished the season on a 7-game losing streak at 8–9, 2–4 against the AFC South, and 2–6 on the road. The Colts became the first team in NFL history to start 8–2 and finish with a losing record.

=== Standings ===
==== Division ====
AFC South
	W	L	T	PCT	DIV	CONF	PF	PA	STK
^{(3)} Jacksonville Jaguars	13	4	0	.765	5–1	10–2	474	336	W8
^{(5)} Houston Texans	12	5	0	.706	5–1	10–2	404	295	W9
Indianapolis Colts	8	9	0	.471	2–4	6–6	466	412	L7
Tennessee Titans	3	14	0	.176	0–6	2–10	284	478	L2

==== Conference ====
AFC
Seed	Team	Division	W	L	T	PCT	DIV	CONF	SOS	SOV	STK
**Division leaders**
1 (Note: Denver finished ahead of New England based on common games (Denver 6–0 to New England 5–1 against: Cincinnati, Las Vegas, NY Giants, NY Jets and Tennessee).)	Denver Broncos	West	14	3	0	.824	5–1	9–3	.422	.378	W2
2	New England Patriots	East	14	3	0	.824	5–1	9–3	.391	.370	W3
3	Jacksonville Jaguars	South	13	4	0	.765	5–1	10–2	.478	.425	W8
4	Pittsburgh Steelers	North	10	7	0	.588	4–2	8–4	.503	.453	W1
**Wild cards**
5 (Note: Houston finished ahead of Buffalo based on head-to-head victory.)	Houston Texans	South	12	5	0	.706	5–1	10–2	.522	.441	W9
6	Buffalo Bills	East	12	5	0	.706	4–2	9–3	.471	.412	W1
7	Los Angeles Chargers	West	11	6	0	.647	5–1	8–4	.469	.425	L2
**Did not qualify for the postseason**
8 (Note: Indianapolis finished ahead of Baltimore based on conference record (Indianapolis 6–6 to Baltimore 5–7).)	Indianapolis Colts	South	8	9	0	.471	2–4	6–6	.540	.382	L7
9	Baltimore Ravens	North	8	9	0	.471	3–3	5–7	.507	.408	L1
10	Miami Dolphins	East	7	10	0	.412	3–3	3–9	.488	.378	L1
11 (Note: Cincinnati finished ahead of Kansas City based on conference record (Cincinnati 5–7 to Kansas City 3–9).)	Cincinnati Bengals	North	6	11	0	.353	3–3	5–7	.521	.451	L1
12	Kansas City Chiefs	West	6	11	0	.353	1–5	3–9	.514	.363	L6
13	Cleveland Browns	North	5	12	0	.294	2–4	4–8	.486	.418	W2
14 (Note: Las Vegas finished ahead of NY Jets and Tennessee based on conference record (Las Vegas 3–9 to NY Jets 2–10 and Tennessee 2–10).)	Las Vegas Raiders	West	3	14	0	.176	1–5	3–9	.538	.451	W1
15 (Note: NY Jets finished ahead of Tennessee based on strength of victory (NY Jets .373 to Tennessee .275).)	New York Jets	East	3	14	0	.176	0–6	2–10	.552	.373	L5
16	Tennessee Titans	South	3	14	0	.176	0–6	2–10	.574	.275	L2
**Tiebreakers** (Note: When breaking ties for three or more teams under the NFL's rules, they are first broken within divisions, then comparing only the highest ranked remaining team from each division.)
