= Sebastian River High School =

Location
- 9001 90th Avenue; Sebastian, Florida 32958-6402; United States; 27°45′23″N 80°30′46″W

Information
- School type: Public, Secondary
- Motto: You Can’t Hide That Shark Pride!
- Established: August 1994
- Locale: Urban
- School district: Indian River County School District
- NCES District ID: 1200930
- NCES School ID: 120093002283
- Principal: Robert Riskin
- Teaching staff: 79.00 (FTE)
- Grades: 9–12
- Gender: Coeducational
- Enrollment: 1,791 (2023-2024)
- Average class size: 38.56
- Student to teacher ratio: 22.67
- Color
- Mascot: Great White Sharks
- Rival: Vero Beach High School
- Website: srhs.indianriverschools.org/o/srhs

Sebastian River High School is a co-educational International Baccalaureate high school in Sebastian, Florida. It opened August 1994 and is operated by the School District of Indian River County.

== Campus ==
Situated on 6.5 acres (2.6 ha) of land, Sebastian River High School is constructed around a central courtyard with a bell tower as its focal point. Its facilities include a 3000-seat sports stadium, a 1060-seat auditorium, a 1680-seat gymnasium, a state-of-the-art television studio, an aqua lab, high-tech vocational labs, a volleyball field, three practice fields, a baseball field, a softball field, eight tennis courts, four basketball courts, a wrestling room, and a cross-country track and field course. It also has 2 separate classroom buildings for the Junior Reserve Officers' Training Corps (JROTC). In 2002, a new freshman wing, the V Wing, was added, bringing the number of classrooms to over 140 and making Sebastian River High School the second largest high school in Indian River County. The V Wing, however, does contain classrooms for students in other classes. For this reason, a new Freshman Learning Center was constructed in 2010, housing mostly freshman students.

== Notable alumni ==
- Bryan Augenstein, Major League Baseball pitcher for the Arizona Diamondbacks.
- Tim Smith, NFL defensive tackle for the Indianapolis Colts.
- Jennifer Welter, first Female Coach in the NFL
- Peyton Prescott, Major League Baseball relief pitcher for the New York Mets.
- Raheem Layne, American professional football safety for the New York Giants of the (NFL). He played college football for the Indiana Hoosiers and was signed by the Los Angeles Chargers Raheem Layne
