= Indian River Charter High School =

Public secondary school in Vero Beach, Florida, United States

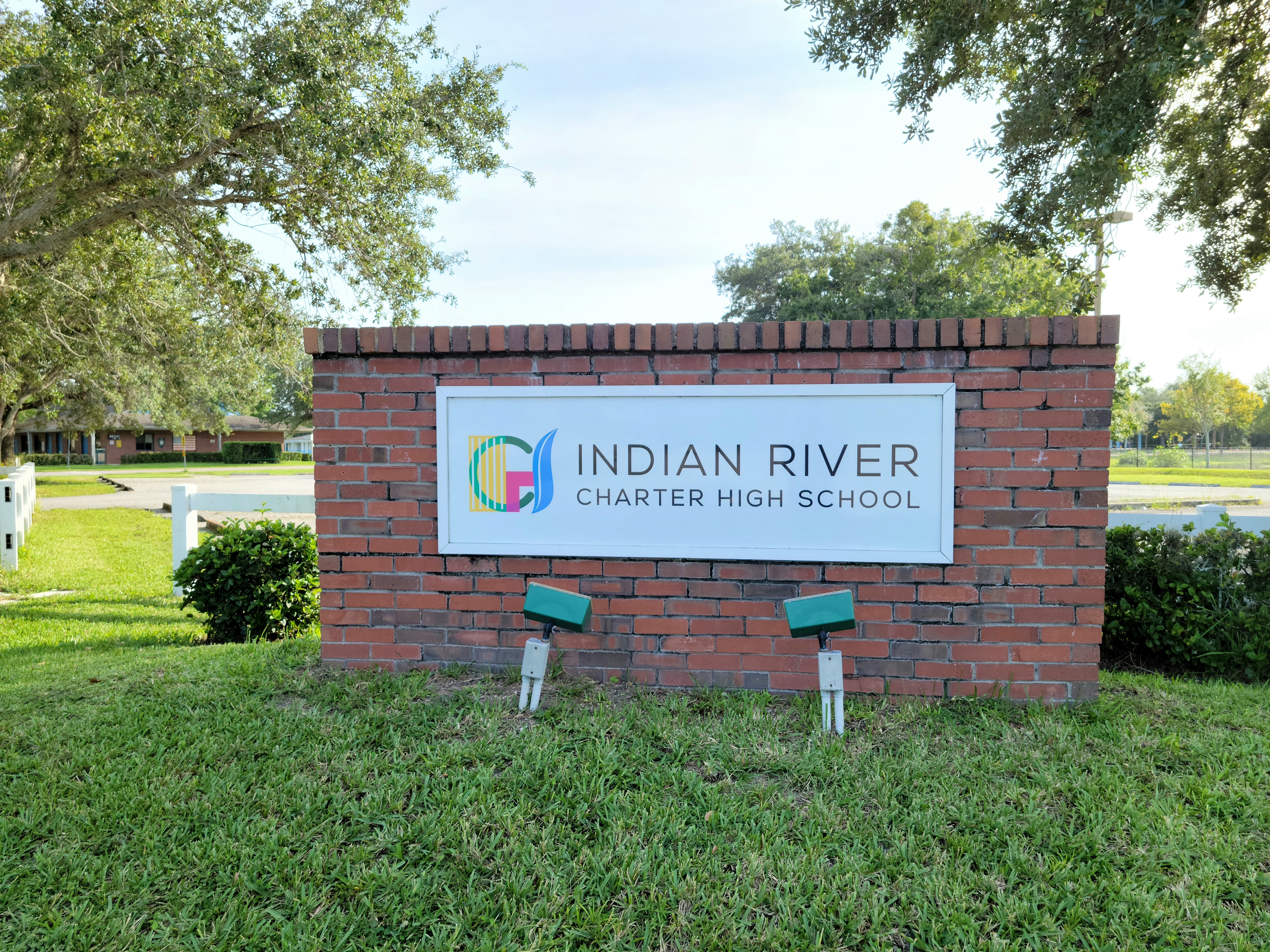

Location
- 6055 College Lane; Vero Beach, Indian River County, Florida, Florida 32966; United States; 27°38′01″N 80°27′09″W

Information
- Other names: IRCHS
- Type: Public Secondary
- Motto: Carpe Diem (Seize the day)
- Established: 1998; 28 years ago
- School district: Indian River County School District
- NCES School ID: 120093003408
- Teaching staff: 33 (FTE)
- Grades: 9–12
- Enrollment: 711 (2023-2024)
- Student to teacher ratio: 20.09
- Campus type: Suburban (Midsize)
- Colors: Ivory and Hunter Green
- Mascot: The Wolf
- Yearbook: Carpe Diem
- Website: irchs.org

Indian River Charter High School (IRCHS) is a co-educational public charter high school in Vero Beach, Florida. The school operates under charter from the Indian River County School District.

== Location ==
The school is located near the Mueller Campus of the Indian River State College.

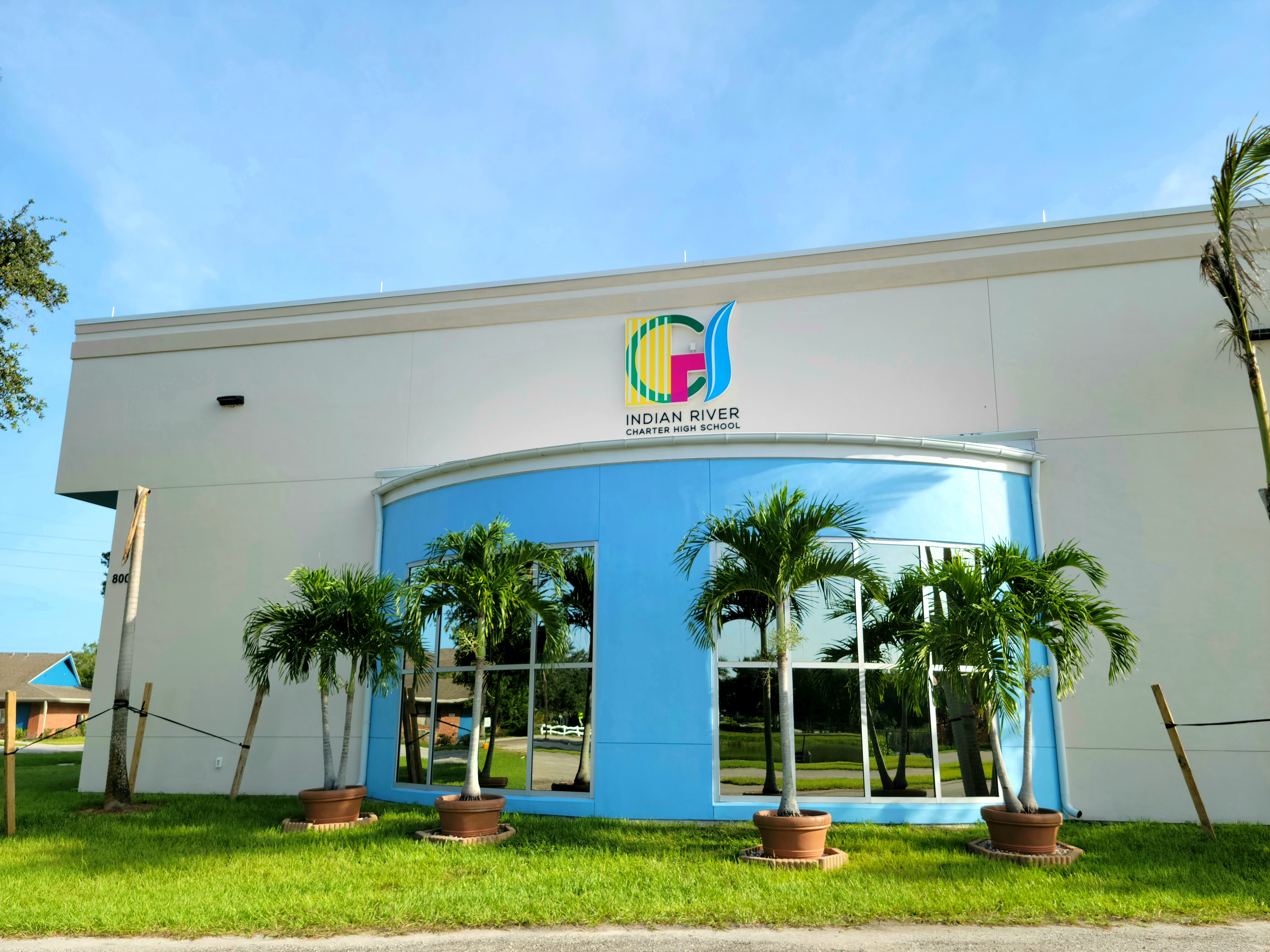
A building on IRCHS campus.
