= Raheem Layne =

American football player (born 1999)

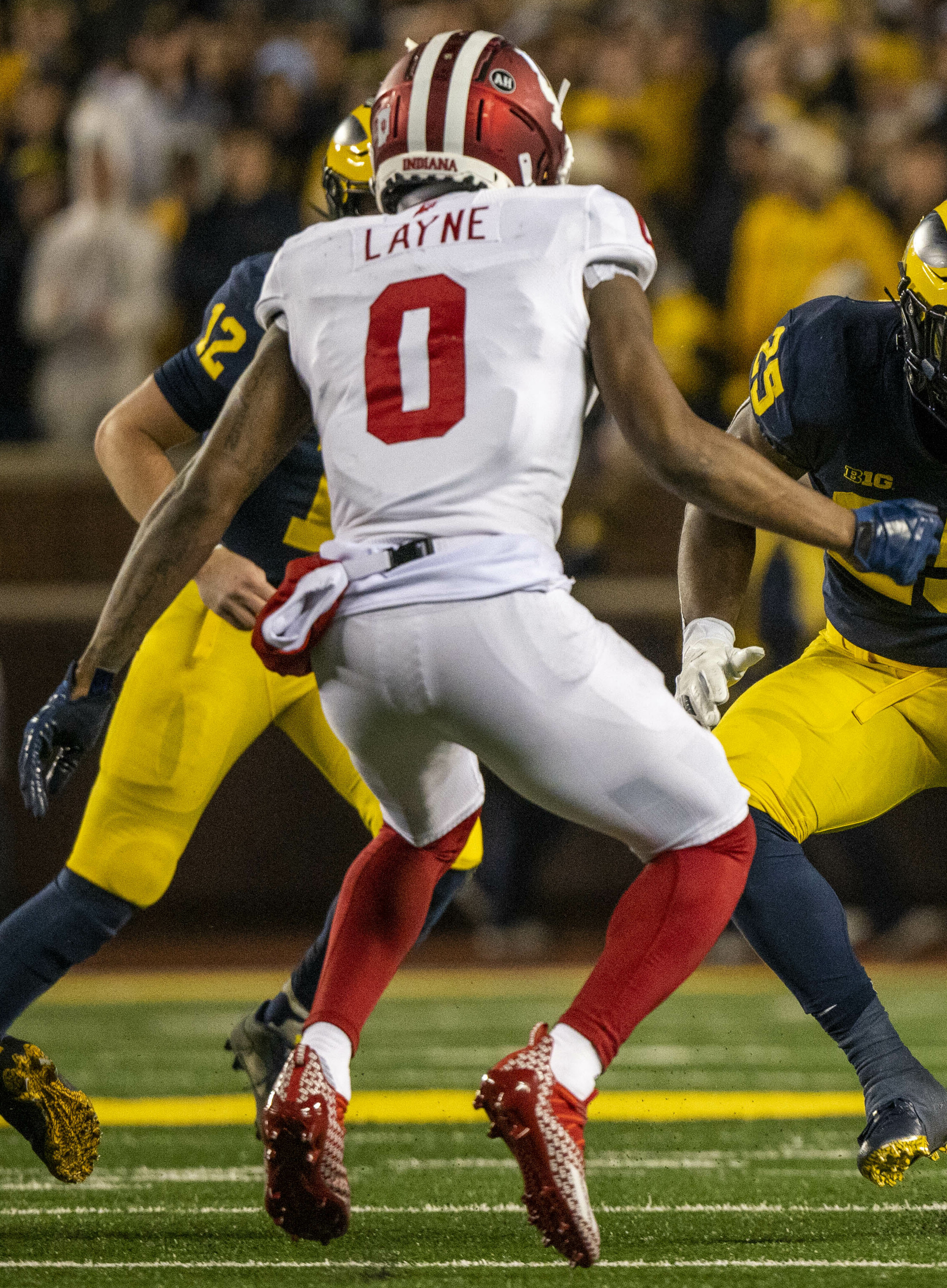
- Layne with Indiana in 2021

No. 43 – New York Giants
- Position: Safety
- Roster status: Practice squad

Personal information
- Born: July 2, 1999 (age 27); DeLand, Florida, U.S.
- Listed height: 5 ft 11 in (1.80 m)
- Listed weight: 192 lb (87 kg)

Career information
- High school: Sebastian River) (Sebastian, Florida)
- College: Indiana (2017–2021)
- NFL draft: 2022: undrafted

Career history
- Los Angeles Chargers (2022–2023); New York Giants (2024–present)

Career NFL statistics as of Week 8, 2026
- Total tackles: 20
- Stats at Pro Football Reference

Raheem Layne (born July 2, 1999) is an American professional football safety for the New York Giants of the National Football League (NFL). He played college football for the Indiana Hoosiers and was signed by the Los Angeles Chargers as an undrafted free agent in 2022.

== Early life and college ==
Layne was born on July 2, 1999, in Deland, Florida. He attended Sebastian River High School and was a three-year player in football. He was named first-team all-area in 2016 and finished his time at Sebastian River with 57 total tackles, two interceptions, and three fumbles forced. He was ranked the 58th-best cornerback nationally by ESPN. A three-star recruit, Layne committed to Indiana University.

As a true freshman at Indiana in 2017, Layne appeared in 12 games, including one as a starter, and made 13 tackles while being named the school's "Defensive Newcomer of the Year." The following season, he started seven games, while appearing in all 12, and recorded 39 tackles as well as three pass breakups and a fumble recovery. After starting the first five games of his junior year, Layne was relegated to a backup role in favor of Tiawan Mullen. Despite being a backup, he still managed to post 30 tackles and was named Indiana's special teams player of the year.

Layne missed the entire 2020 season with an injury. He changed his position from cornerback to safety prior to the 2021 season. As a senior that year, he tallied 65 total tackles, one interception, one fumble forced and a pass breakup while starting all 12 matches. He decided to enter the NFL draft after the season, and finished his college career with 50 career games played, 147 tackles, two forced fumbles and an interception.

== Professional career ==
Pre-draft measurables
Height	Weight	Arm length	Hand span	Wingspan	40-yard dash	10-yard split	20-yard split	20-yard shuttle	Three-cone drill	Vertical jump	Broad jump	Bench press
5 ft 11 1/8 in (1.81 m)	192 lb (87 kg)	30 1/2 in (0.77 m)	9 3/8 in (0.24 m)	6 ft 2 1/4 in (1.89 m)	4.58 s	1.55 s	2.63 s	4.45 s	7.34 s	34.5 in (0.88 m)	10 ft 0 in (3.05 m)	14 reps
All values from Pro Day

=== Los Angeles Chargers ===
After going unselected in the 2022 NFL draft, Layne was signed by the Los Angeles Chargers as an undrafted free agent. He was released at the final roster cuts but was subsequently brought back on the practice squad. He was elevated to the active roster for their game against the Arizona Cardinals, and made his NFL debut in the game, appearing on nine special teams snaps. He was signed to the active roster on December 26, 2022. He finished the season having played six games while recording two tackles.

On October 18, 2023, the Chargers placed Layne on injured reserve due to a torn ACL.

=== New York Giants ===
On August 15, 2024, Layne signed with the New York Giants. He was waived on August 27, and re-signed to the practice squad. Layne was promoted to the active roster on December 21. On December 24, it was announced that Layne would miss the remainder of the season after suffering a torn meniscus in the Giants' Week 16 loss to the Atlanta Falcons.

On August 26, 2025, Layne was waived by the Giants as part of final roster cuts and re-signed to the practice squad the next day. He was promoted to the active roster on December 27.

On August 30, 2026, Layne was released by the Giants; he was re-signed to the team's practice squad the following day.
