= School District of Indian River County =

Public school district in Florida

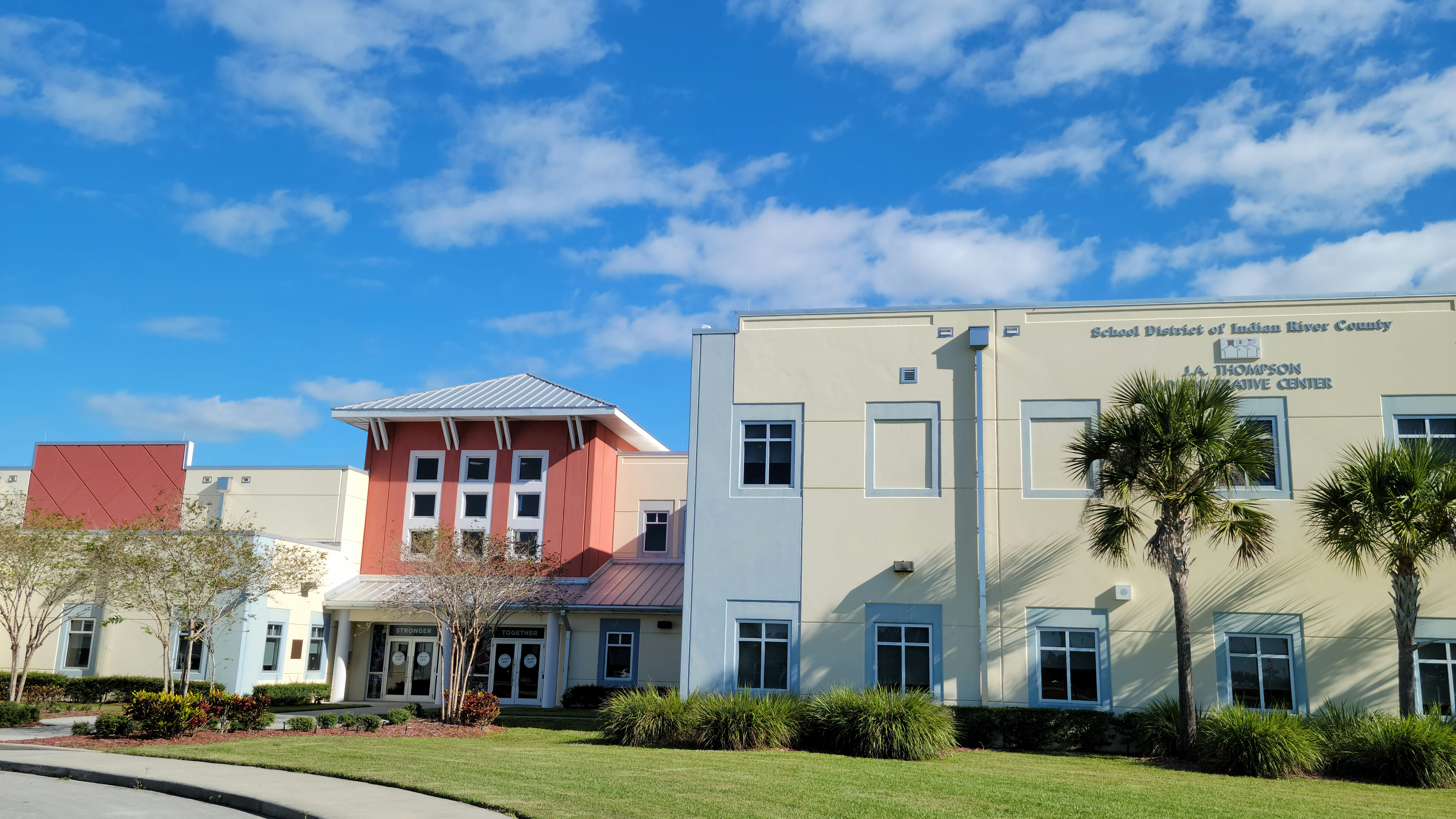
- J.A. Thompson Administrative Center Building

Address
- 6500 57th Street Vero Beach, Indian River, Florida, 32967; United States

District information
- Type: Public
- Grades: K-12
- Superintendent: Dr. David Moore
- NCES District ID: 1200930

Other information
- Website: www.indianriverschools.org

School District of Indian River County (SDIRC), also known as Indian River County School District, is a public school district that covers Indian River County, Florida. The district headquarters are in Vero Beach.

== Superintendent ==
The current superintendent of the Indian River county school district is David K. Moore, Ed.D. Before joining the district, he was an assistant superintendent of Miami-Dade County Public Schools.

== School board ==
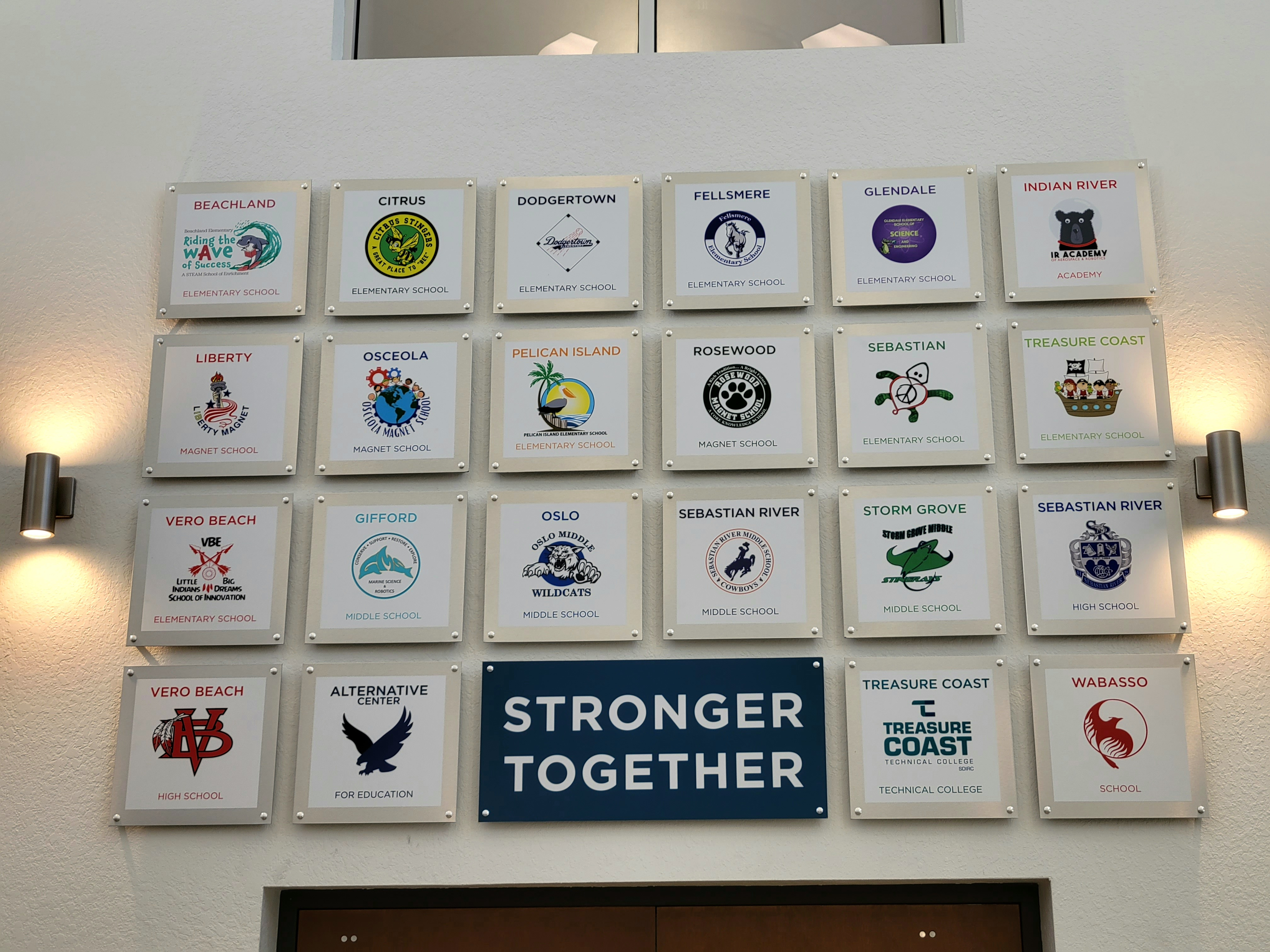
School logos at the J.A. Thompson Administrative Center of the School District of Indian River County.

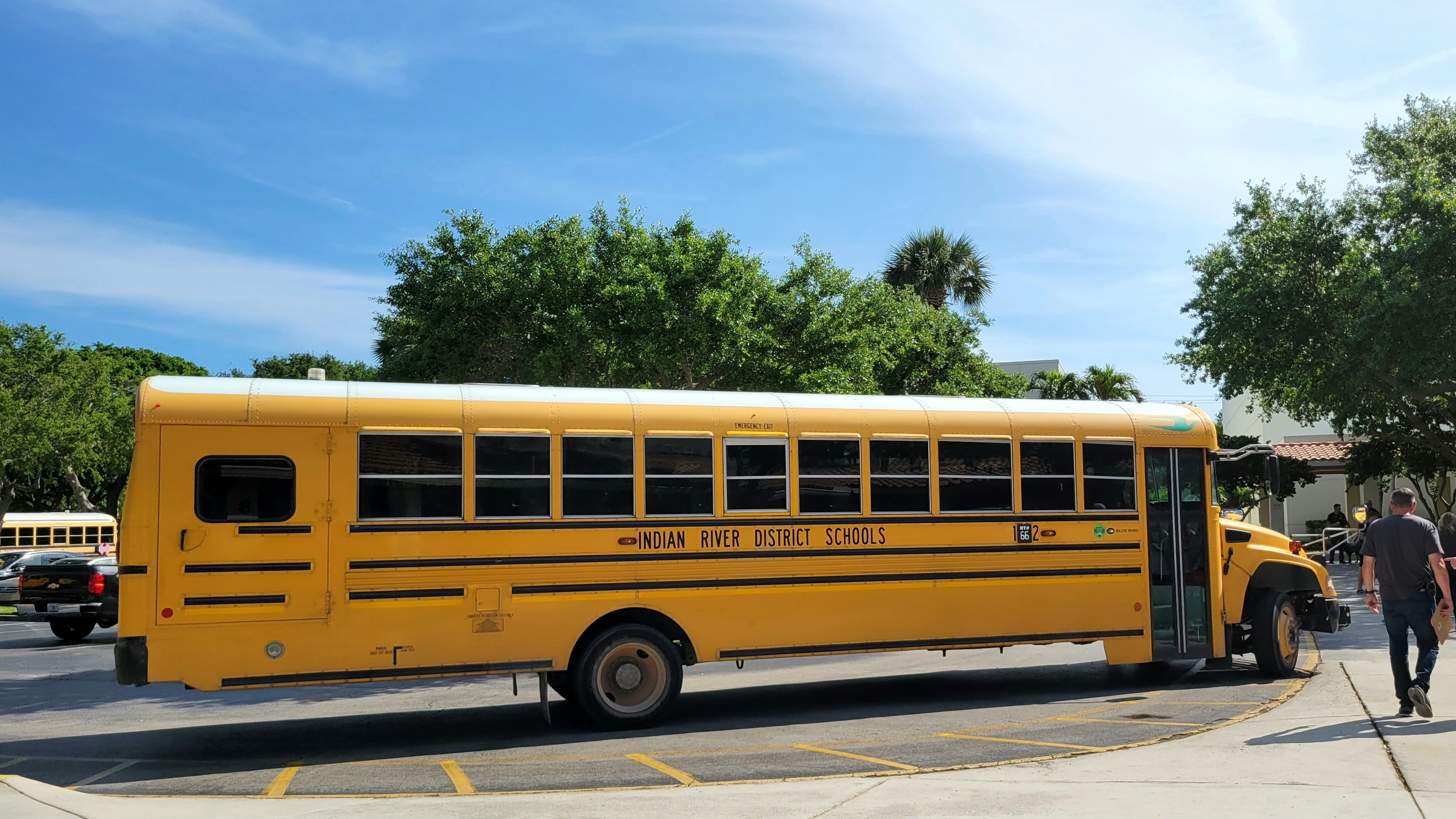
School Bus with Indian River District logo.

The district school board is elected on a non-partisan basis.

- District 1: Dr. Gene Posca
- District 2: Jacqueline Rosario
- District 3: Peggy Jones - vice chairman
- District 4: Teri L. Barenborg - chairman
- District 5: David Dyer

== Schools ==
The district operates the following public schools:

=== High schools ===
Sebastian River High School

- Sebastian, Florida
- Principal: Robert Riskin
- Mascot: Sharks

Vero Beach High School

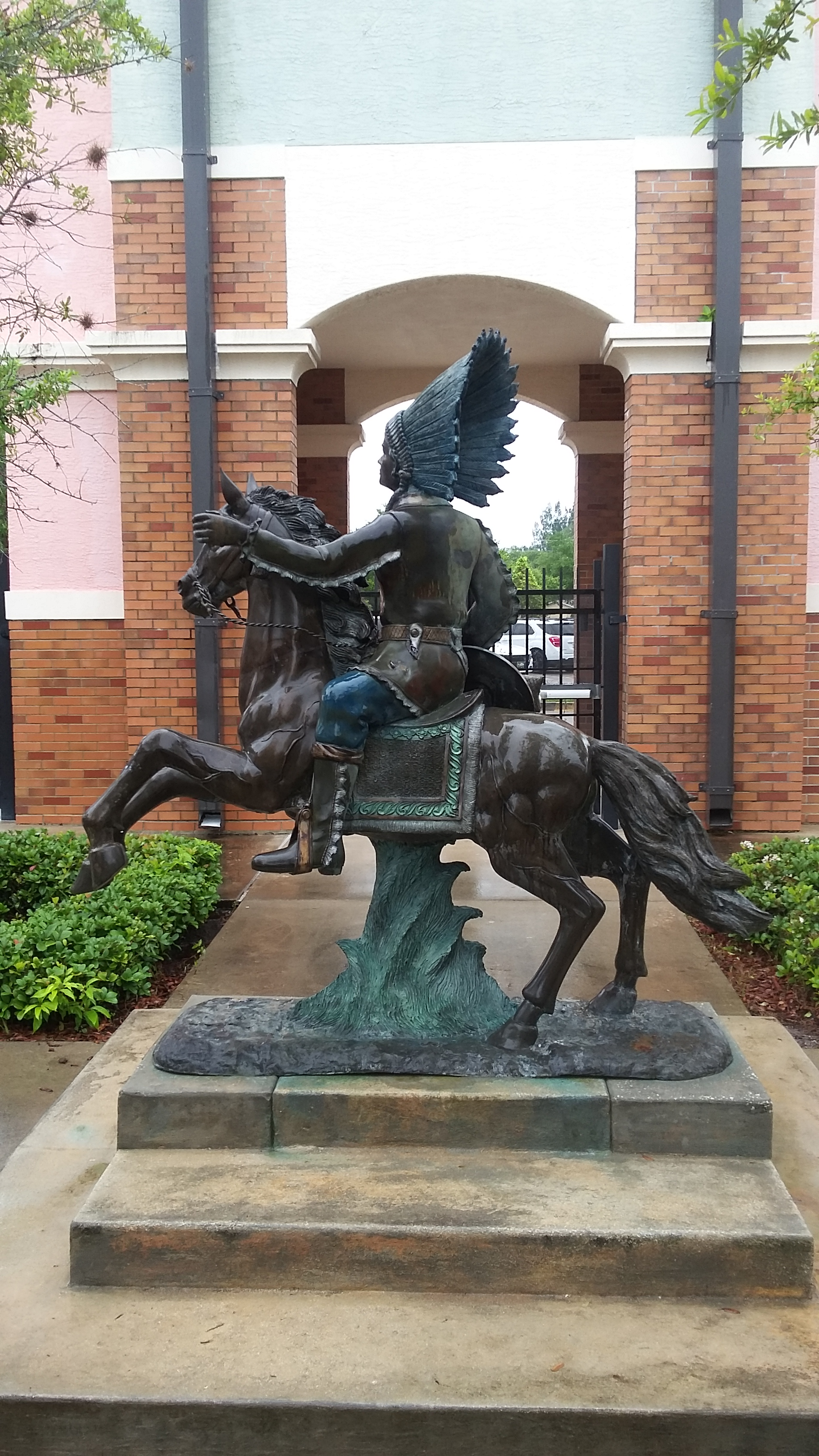
Fighting Indian statue

- Vero Beach, Florida
- Principal: Rachel Finnegan
- Mascot: Fighting Indians

=== Middle schools ===
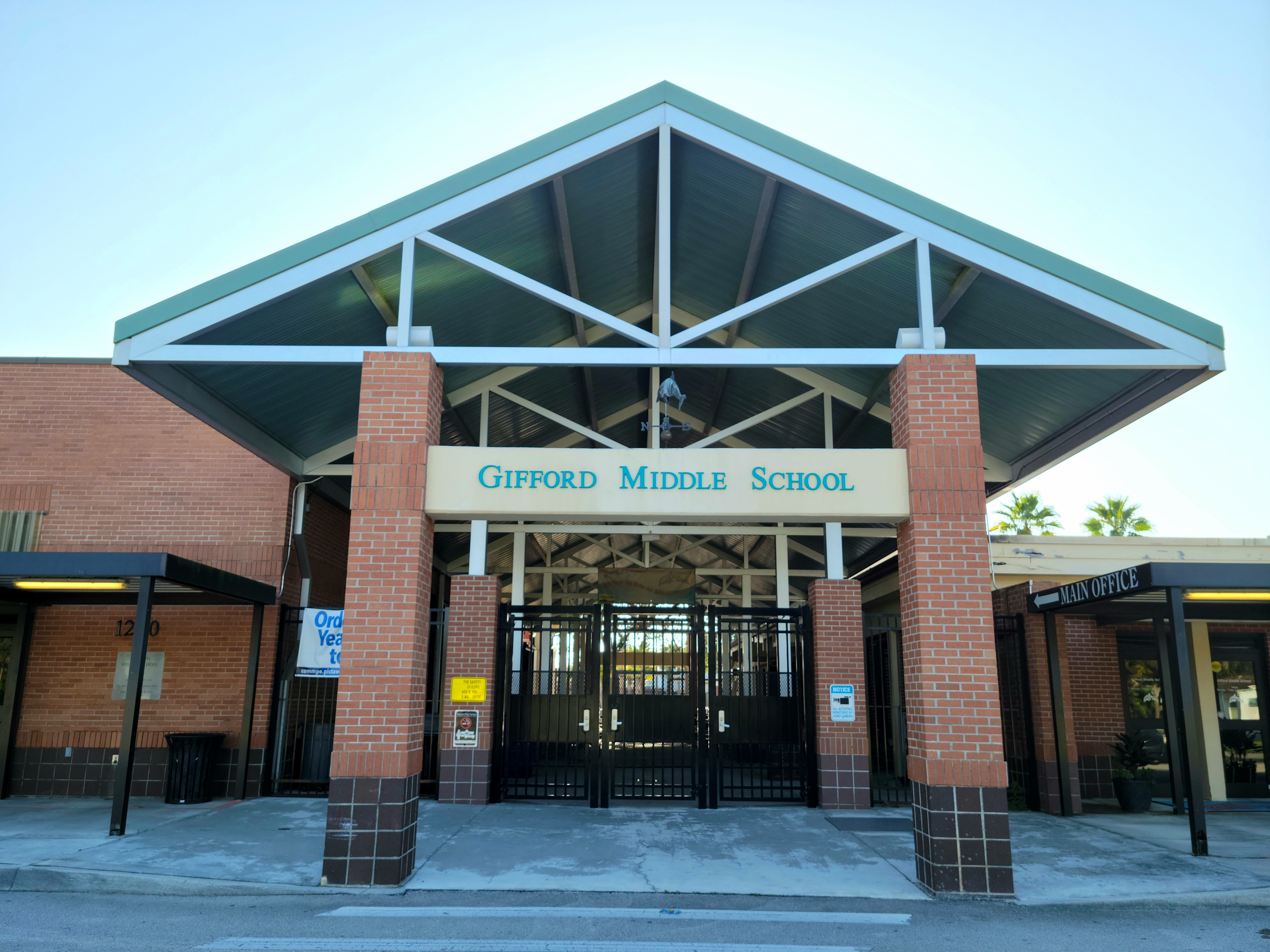
Gifford Middle School main entrance

Gifford Middle School

- Vero Beach, Florida
- Principal: James Thimmer
- Mascot: Tigers

Oslo Middle School

- Vero Beach, Florida
- Principal: Rahshard Morgan
- Mascot: Wildcats

Sebastian River Middle School

- Sebastian, Florida
- Principal: Robert Riskin
- Mascot: Cowboys

Storm Grove Middle School

- Vero Beach, Florida
- Principal: Demarcus Harris
- Mascot: Stingrays

=== Magnet elementary schools ===
Liberty Magnet School

- Vero Beach, Florida
- Principal: Christopher Taylor

Osceola Magnet School

- Vero Beach, Florida
- Principal: Jennifer Norris
- Mascot: Explorers

Rosewood Magnet School

- Vero Beach, Florida
- Principal: Adam Faust

=== Elementary schools ===
Beachland Elementary School

- Vero Beach, Florida
- Principal: Vanessa Gonzalez
- Mascot: Sharks
- A STEAM school of excellence.

Citrus Elementary School

- Vero Beach, Florida
- Principal: Tosha Jones
- Mascot: Bees

Dodgertown Elementary School

- Vero Beach, Florida
- Principal: Felice Bagley
- Mascot: Dodgers

Fellsmere Elementary School

- Fellsmere, Florida
- Principal: Ramon Echeverria
- Mascot: Mustangs

Glendale Elementary School

- Vero Beach, Florida
- Principal: Casandra Flores
- Mascot: Gators

Indian River Academy

- Vero Beach, Florida
- Principal: Kimberly Rahal
- Mascot: Black Bears

Pelican Island Elementary School

- Sebastian, Florida
- Principal: Jennifer Justice
- Mascot: Pelicans

Sebastian Elementary School

- Sebastian, Florida
- Principal: Letitcia Whitfield-Hart
- Mascot: Sea Turtles

Treasure Coast Elementary School

- Sebastian, Florida
- Principal: Jeramy Keen
- Mascot: Pirates

Vero Beach Elementary School

- Vero Beach, Florida
- Principal: Lyndsey Samberg
- Mascot: Indians

=== Charter schools ===
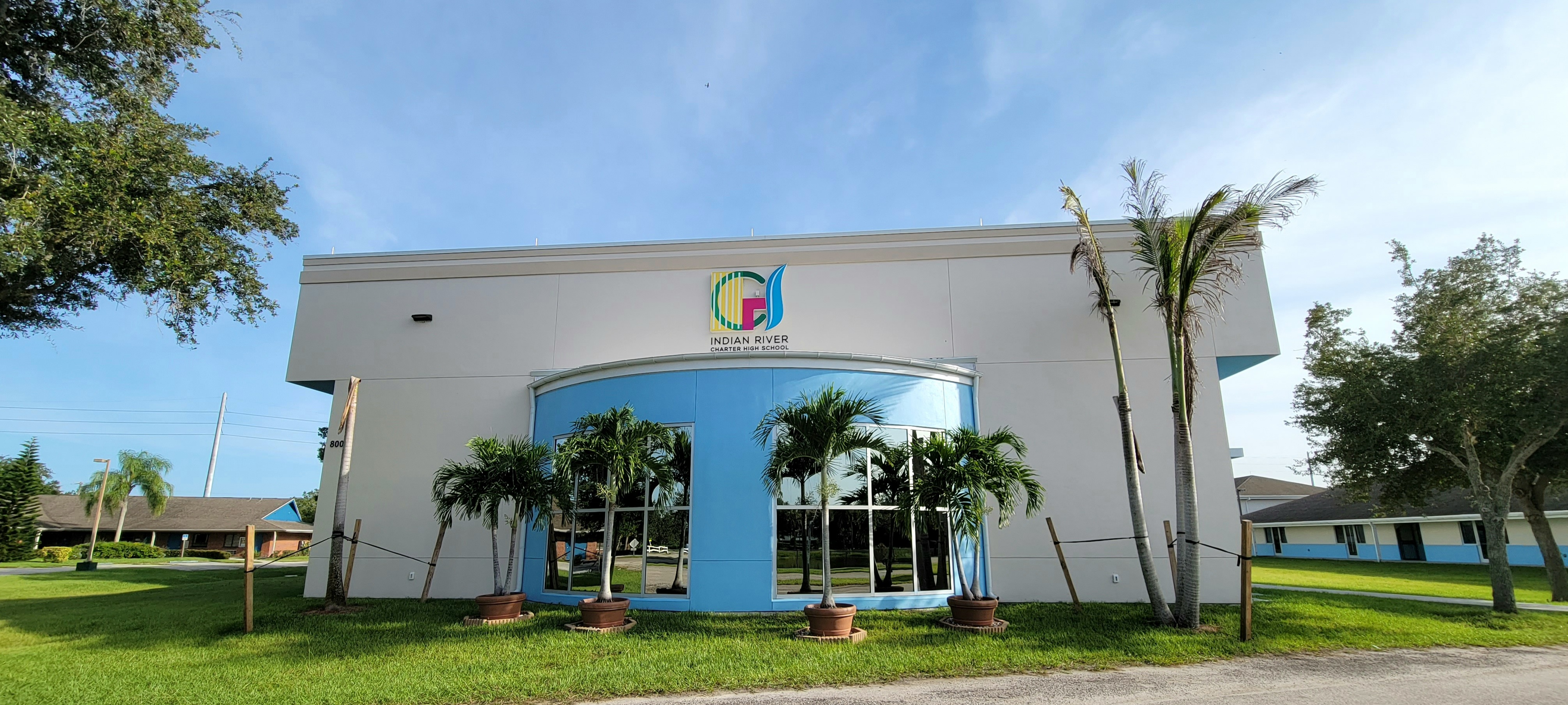
Indian River Charter High School (IRCHS) Vero Beach building 1

- Imagine Schools at South Vero
- Indian River Charter High School
- North County Charter Elementary School
- Sebastian Charter Junior High School

=== Alternative schools ===
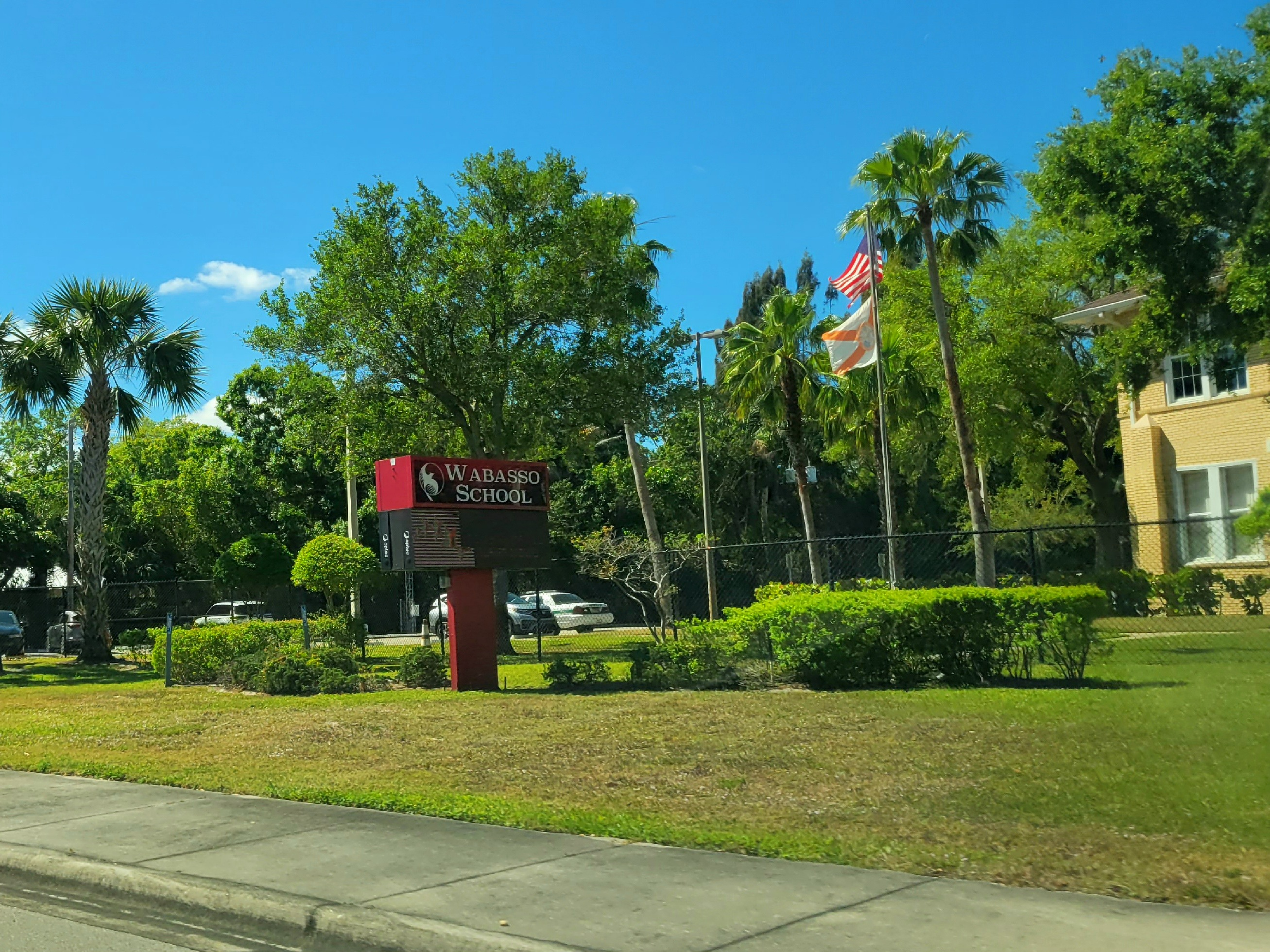
Wabasso School on US–1 in Wabasso.

- Alternative Center for Education
- Wabasso School

=== Other programs ===
The district operates adult and community education programs.
The district operates the Vero Beach High School environmental technology program.
