= Trey Washington =

American football player (born 2002)

No. 41 – Indianapolis Colts
- Position: Safety
- Roster status: Practice squad

Personal information
- Born: December 9, 2002 (age 23); Trussville, Alabama, U.S.
- Listed height: 5 ft 10 in (1.78 m)
- Listed weight: 205 lb (93 kg)

Career information
- High school: Hewitt-Trussville (Trussville)
- College: Ole Miss (2021–2024)
- NFL draft: 2025: undrafted

Career history
- Indianapolis Colts (2025–present)
- Stats at Pro Football Reference

Samuel Baron "Trey" Washington (born December 9, 2002) is an American professional football safety for the Indianapolis Colts of the National Football League (NFL). He played college football for the Ole Miss Rebels.

== Early life ==
Washington was born December 9, 2002, in Trussville, Alabama. He attended and played football and basketball at Hewitt-Trussville High School in Trussville. He was a two-time all-state selection in high school; rated a three-star college football prospect and ranked the No. 90 cornerback prospect in the country, he committed to play for the Ole Miss Rebels.

== College career ==
As a freshman in 2021, Washington played in 13 games for the Ole Miss Rebels as a defensive tackle and special teams player, recording 23 tackles. Washington moved to defensive back in 2022, starting in three of his 13 games and recording 31 tackles, two pass breakups, and a forced fumble. He recorded nine tackles in a starting role against the Texas Tech Red Raiders in the 2022 Texas Bowl.

Washington started in all 13 games in 2023; his 83 tackles led his team, as did his three interceptions. He added two pass breakups, a forced fumble, and a fumble recovery to his junior campaign and was named third-team All-SEC by College Football Network. He appeared in every defensive play during Ole Miss's 2023 Peach Bowl win against the Penn State Nittany Lions and recorded eight solo tackles in the game.

As a senior in 2024, Washington again started in all 13 games, recording 64 tackles, eight pass breakups, one interception, and one forced fumble. His Pro Football Focus tackling grade of 90.2 was first in the SEC. Washington opted to play in the Rebels' bowl game at the conclusion of the season. Starting at nickelback, Washington led Ole Miss and set a personal record with 10 tackles in a win against the Duke Blue Devils in the 2025 Gator Bowl. After the 2024 season, Washington declared for the 2025 NFL draft.

Washington graduated from the University of Mississippi with a bachelor's degree in integrated marketing communications.

== Professional career ==
Pre-draft measurables
Height	Weight	Arm length	Hand span	Wingspan	40-yard dash	10-yard split	20-yard split	20-yard shuttle	Three-cone drill	Vertical jump	Broad jump	Bench press
5 ft 9 3/4 in (1.77 m)	205 lb (93 kg)	31 5/8 in (0.80 m)	9 in (0.23 m)	6 ft 4 3/8 in (1.94 m)	4.51 s	1.55 s	2.61 s	4.56 s	7.19 s	36.0 in (0.91 m)	10 ft 1 in (3.07 m)	23 reps
All values from Pro Day

After going unselected in the 2025 NFL draft, Washington signed with the Indianapolis Colts as an undrafted free agent. On August 3, 2025, Colts running back Salvon Ahmed sustained a severe injury to his right ankle when Washington tackled him during a team practice. The tackle was described as a hip-drop tackle that would have been prohibited in an NFL game. Washington was waived by the Colts on August 26 and was signed to the team's practice squad on August 27. He was released from the practice squad on September 9. Washington was re-signed to the Colts' practice squad on September 13. He was promoted to the active roster on October 1. Washington was waived by the Colts on November 1. On November 4, he re-signed with the Colts' practice squad.

Washington signed a reserve/future contract with Indianapolis on January 5, 2026. He was waived by Indianapolis as a part of final roster cuts on August 30. The following day, Washington was re–signed to the team's practice squad.

== NFL career statistics ==
Year	Team	Games		Tackles				Interceptions						Fumbles		
Year	Team	GP	GS	Cmb	Solo	Ast	Sck	PD	Int	Yds	Avg	Lng	TD	FF	FR	TD
2025	IND	4	0	4	0	4	0	0	0	0	0	0	0	0	0	0
Total		4	0	4	0	4	0	0	0	0	0	0	0	0	0	0
