= Tim Smith (defensive tackle) =

American football player (born 2002)

No. 93 – Indianapolis Colts
- Position: Defensive tackle
- Roster status: Active

Personal information
- Born: August 9, 2002 (age 24); Gifford, Florida, U.S.
- Listed height: 6 ft 4 in (1.93 m)
- Listed weight: 306 lb (139 kg)

Career information
- High school: Sebastian River (Sebastian, Florida)
- College: Alabama (2020–2024)
- NFL draft: 2025: 6th round, 190th overall pick

Career history
- Indianapolis Colts (2025–present)
- Stats at Pro Football Reference

Timothy Smith (born August 9, 2002) is an American professional football defensive tackle for the Indianapolis Colts of the National Football League (NFL). He played college football for the Alabama Crimson Tide and was selected by the Colts in the sixth round of the 2025 NFL draft.

== Early life ==
Smith attended Sebastian River High School in Sebastian, Florida. As a senior in 2019, he had 98 tackles and 14 sacks. A five-star recruit, Smith committed to the University of Alabama to play college football.

== College career ==
Smith played at Alabama from 2020 to 2024. During his career he played in 64 games with 32 starts and had 125 tackles and 6.5 sacks. He entered the 2025 NFL draft after the 2024 season and played in the 2025 Senior Bowl.

== Professional career ==
Pre-draft measurables
Height	Weight	Arm length	Hand span	Wingspan	40-yard dash	10-yard split	20-yard split	20-yard shuttle	Three-cone drill	Vertical jump	Broad jump
6 ft 4 3/8 in (1.94 m)	302 lb (137 kg)	33 in (0.84 m)	10 3/8 in (0.26 m)	6 ft 9 5/8 in (2.07 m)	5.17 s	1.82 s	2.93 s	4.69 s	7.75 s	23.0 in (0.58 m)	8 ft 2 in (2.49 m)
All values from NFL Combine/Pro Day

Smith was selected with the 190th overall pick in the sixth round of the 2025 NFL draft by the Indianapolis Colts. He signed a four-year contract with the Colts on May 9, 2025. Smith was waived on August 27 and re-signed to the practice squad the next day. He signed a reserve/future contract with Indianapolis on January 5, 2026.
