= List of Albany State Golden Rams in the NFL draft =

This is a list of Albany State Golden Rams football players in the NFL draft.

== Key ==
B	Back	K	Kicker	NT	Nose tackle
C	Center	LB	Linebacker	FB	Fullback
DB	Defensive back	P	Punter	HB	Halfback
DE	Defensive end	QB	Quarterback	WR	Wide receiver
DT	Defensive tackle	RB	Running back	G	Guard
E	End	T	Offensive tackle	TE	Tight end

== Selections ==
Year	Round	Pick	Player	Team	Position
1968	8	211	Frank Brown	Dallas Cowboys	DT
1969	9	214	Joe Walker	Boston Patriots	DE
1970	10	238	Willie Dixon	Buffalo Bills	DB
1974	10	241	Art Cameron	Buffalo Bills	TE
1974	11	277	Eddie Wilson	Atlanta Falcons	WR
1975	16	405	Greg Wells	New York Jets	G
1975	17	433	Lester Sherman	Denver Broncos	RB
1976	14	394	Jeremiah Cummings	Baltimore Colts	DE
1979	4	84	James White	Cincinnati Bengals	DT
1979	7	185	Curtis Bunche	Philadelphia Eagles	DT
1982	11	295	George Thompson	Dallas Cowboys	WR
1989	11	291	Jeffrey Hunter	Phoenix Cardinals	DE
1990	9	221	Kenneth Gant	Dallas Cowboys	DB
2002	6	189	Keyon Nash	Oakland Raiders	DB
2017	4	144	Grover Stewart	Indianapolis Colts	DT
