= National Register of Historic Places listings in Miller County, Georgia =

This is a list of properties and districts in Miller County, Georgia that are listed on the National Register of Historic Places (NRHP).

This National Park Service list is complete through NPS recent listings posted March 21, 2025.

== Current listings ==
	Name on the Register	Image	Date listed	Location	City or town	Description
1	Colquitt Town Square Historic District	Colquitt Town Square Historic District	March 31, 1983 (#83000237)	Cuthbert, 1st, College, and Main Sts. 31°10′17″N 84°44′03″W	Colquitt	Hunter Theatre (formerly known as the Colquitt) on North First Street
