= Miller County Courthouse =

Miller County Courthouse may refer to:

- Miller County Courthouse (Arkansas), Texarkana, Arkansas
- Miller County Courthouse (Georgia), Colquitt, Georgia
