= Jeff Hunter =

Jeff Hunter may refer to:

- alternative stage name for American actor Jeffrey Hunter (1926–1969)
- Jeff Hunter (politician) (born 1959), Australian member of New South Wales Legislative Assembly
- Jeff Hunter (American football) (born 1966), defensive lineman in NFL, CFL and WLA
