= Tarrer Inn =

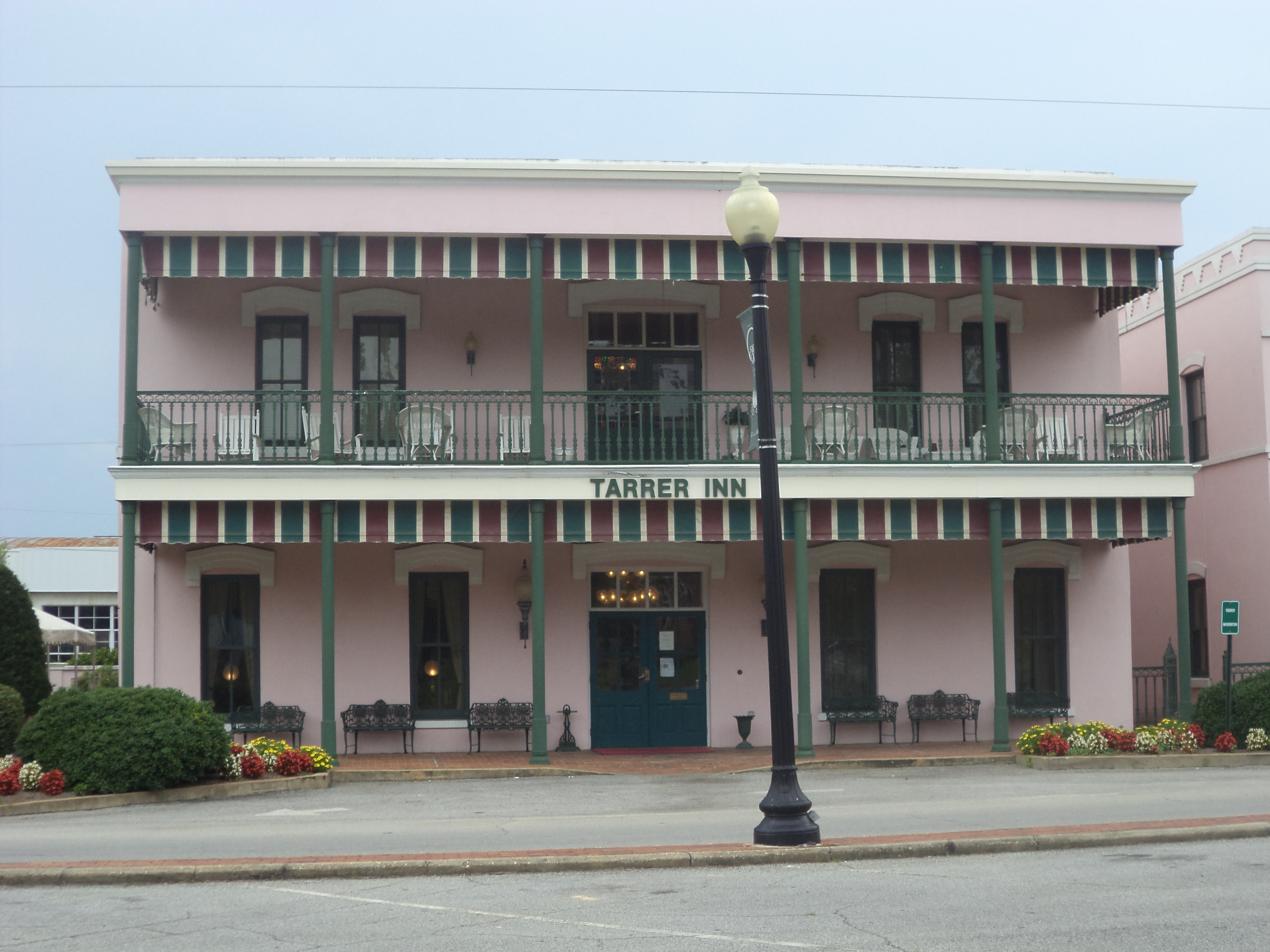
Tarrer Inn in Colquitt, Georgia

Tarrer Inn is a historic hotel in Colquitt, Georgia. It was built as a residence in 1861, burned in a 1902 fire, and was then rebuilt with brick. It opened as a hotel in 1915.

The hotel was renovated during 1992–1994. It has 12 guest rooms decorated with antiques and hand-painted fireplace mantels. It also has a restaurant serving Southern cuisine.
