= Boykin, Georgia =

- Unincorporated community Census-designated place
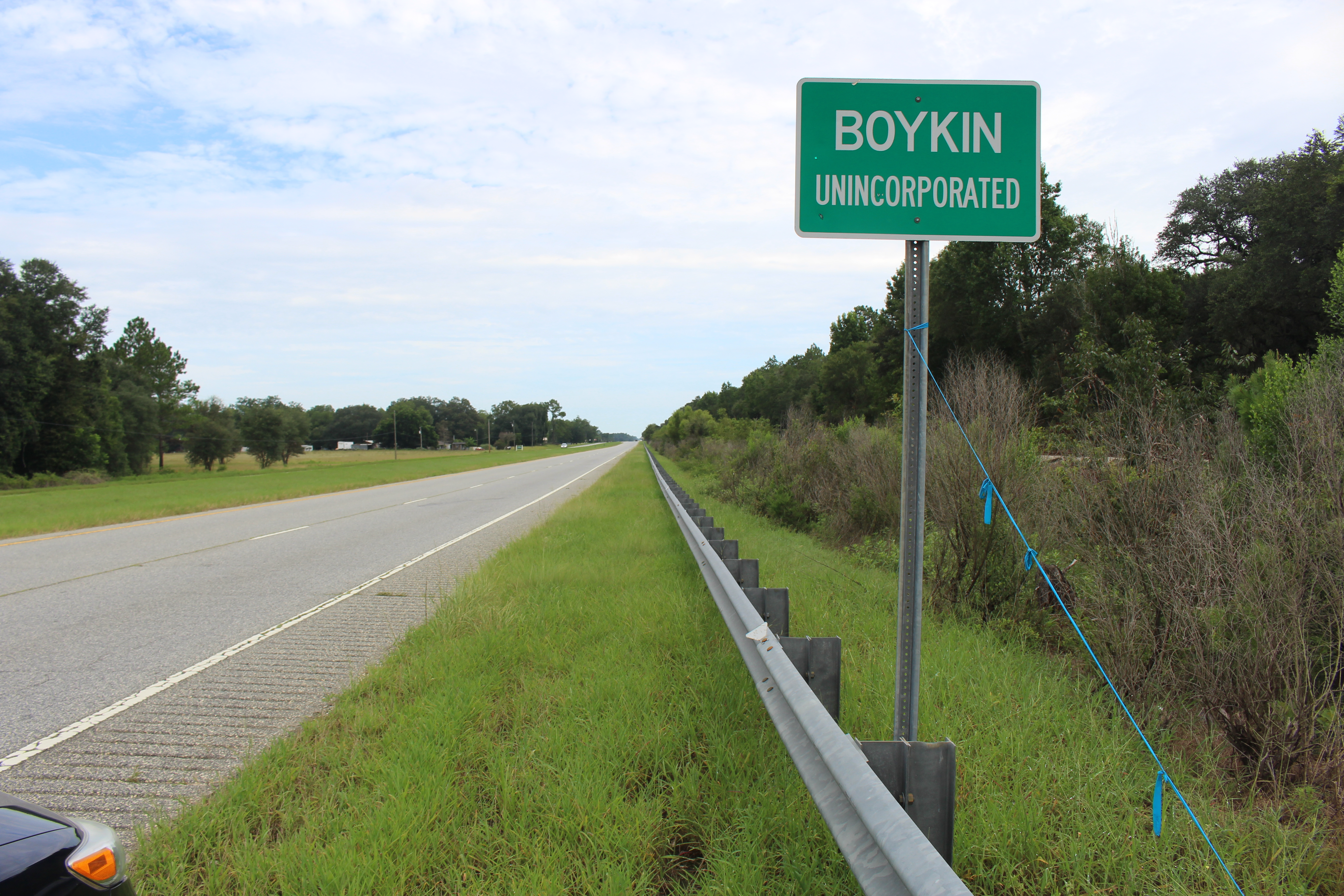
- Boykin limit on US27 / GA1

- Location within Georgia Location within the United States
- Coordinates: 31°6′18″N 84°41′13″W
- Country: United States
- State: Georgia
- County: Miller

Area
  - Total: 2.425 sq mi (6.28 km^{2})
  - Land: 2.421 sq mi (6.27 km^{2})
  - Water: 0.004 sq mi (0.010 km^{2})
- Elevation: 131 ft (40 m)

Population (2020)
  - Total: 151
  - Density: 62.37/sq mi (24.08/km^{2})
- Time zone: UTC-5 (Eastern (EST))
  - Summer (DST): UTC-4 (EDT)
- ZIP code: 39837 (Colquitt)
- Area code: 229
- FIPS code: 13-09852
- GNIS feature ID: 2587025

Boykin is an unincorporated community and census-designated place (CDP) in Miller County, Georgia, United States. The 2020 census listed a population of 151.

== History ==
The community most likely was named after Guilford A. Boyken Sr., an early settler. A post office called Boykin was established in 1897 and remained in operation until 1932.

The Georgia General Assembly incorporated the place as the "Town of Boykin" in 1903. The town's charter was dissolved in 1995.

== Geography ==
Boykin is located along U.S. Route 27 in southern Miller County, 5 miles (8 km) southeast of Colquitt, the county seat, and 16 miles (26 km) northwest of Bainbridge. The CDP is bordered to the south by Big Drain, which flows west to Spring Creek, which continues south to Lake Seminole near the confluence of the Flint and Chattahoochee rivers to form the Apalachicola River.

According to the U.S. Census Bureau, the Boykin CDP has a total area of 2.4 square miles (6.2 km^{2}), of which 0.004 square miles (2.6 acres), or 0.16%, are water.

== Demographics ==
Historical population
Census	Pop.	Note	%±
2010	143		—
2020	151		5.6%
U.S. Decennial Census; 1850-1870 1870-1880; 1890-1910 1920-1930; 1940 1950 1960; 1970 1980 1990; 2000 2010 2020

Boykin was first listed as a census designated place in the 2010 U.S. census.

Boykin CDP, Georgia – Racial and ethnic composition Note: the US Census treats Hispanic/Latino as an ethnic category. This table excludes Latinos from the racial categories and assigns them to a separate category. Hispanics/Latinos may be of any race.
Race / Ethnicity (NH = Non-Hispanic)	Pop 2010	Pop 2020	% 2010	% 2020
White alone (NH)	107	93	74.83%	61.59%
Black or African American alone (NH)	30	31	20.98%	20.53%
Native American or Alaska Native alone (NH)	0	2	0.00%	1.32%
Asian alone (NH)	0	0	0.00%	0.00%
Pacific Islander alone (NH)	0	0	0.00%	0.00%
Other race alone (NH)	0	1	0.00%	0.66%
Mixed race or Multiracial (NH)	3	4	2.10%	2.65%
Hispanic or Latino (any race)	3	20	2.10%	13.25%
Total	143	151	100.00%	100.00%
