= Hampton Smith =

American football and baseball coach (1934–2023)

Biographical details
- Born: October 1, 1934; Mississippi, U.S.
- Died: October 2, 2023 (aged 89); Albany, Georgia, U.S.

Playing career

Football
- 1953–1956: Mississippi Vocational / Mississippi Valley State

Coaching career (HC unless noted)

Football
- 1959: Mississippi Valley State (assistant)
- 1960–1961: McComb HS (MS)
- 1962–1968: J. E. Johnson HS (MS)
- 1969–1970: Tennessee State (assistant)
- 1971–1976: Albany State
- 1977–1978: Arkansas–Pine Bluff (assistant)
- 1979: Mississippi Valley State (OB)
- 1980–1981: Albany State (assistant)
- 1982–1999: Albany State

Baseball
- 1981–1983: Albany State

Head coaching record
- Overall: 157–90–4 (college football); 46–37–1 (college baseball)
- Tournaments: Football; 1–5 (NCAA D-II playoffs)

Accomplishments and honors

Championships
- Football; 9 SIAC (1984–1986, 1988, 1993–1997)

Hampton Lee Smith (October 1, 1934 – October 2, 2023) was an American football and baseball coach. He served two stints as the head football coach at Albany State University in Albany, Georgia, from 1971 to 1976 and again from 1982 to 1999, and compiling a record of 157–90–4. Smith was also the head baseball coach at Albany State from 1981 to 1983, tallying a mark of 46–37–1. Before being hired at Albany State, Smith coached high school football at McComb High School and Prentiss High School, both in Mississippi. He graduated from Mississippi Vocational College (now Mississippi Valley State University) and earned a master's degree from Tennessee State University.

Smith died on October 2, 2023, one day after his 89th birthday.

== Head coaching record ==
=== College football ===
Year	Team	Overall	Conference	Standing	Bowl/playoffs	NCAA^{#}
Albany State Golden Rams (Southern Intercollegiate Athletic Conference) (1971–1976)
1971	Albany State	3–5–1				
1972	Albany State	7–2–1	4–1–1			
1973	Albany State	6–3–1	3–2	T–3rd (Division I)		
1974	Albany State	3–7	1–4	T–5th (Division I)		
1975	Albany State	3–6	3–2	T–3rd (Division I)		
1976	Albany State	5–5	1–4	6th (Division I)		
Albany State Golden Rams (Southern Intercollegiate Athletic Conference) (1982–1999)
1982	Albany State	1–9	1–6			
1983	Albany State	4–6	2–3			
1984	Albany State	7–2	6–1	1st		
1985	Albany State	9–2	5–1	T–st		T–12
1986	Albany State	9–2	5–1	1st		T–18
1987	Albany State	8–3	5–2			
1988	Albany State	8–2	6–1	T–1st		12
1989	Albany State	5–5	2–4	T–4th		
1990	Albany State	6–4	4–3	T–4th		
1991	Albany State	3–7	2–6	8th		
1992	Albany State	6–4–1	5–1–1	2nd		
1993	Albany State	11–1	8–0	1st	L NCAA Division II First Round	8
1994	Albany State	10–2	8–0	1st	L NCAA Division II First Round	11
1995	Albany State	8–4	7–1	1st	L NCAA Division II First Round	12
1996	Albany State	8–3	5–1	1st	L NCAA Division II First Round	14
1997	Albany State	11–1	6–0	1st	L NCAA Division II Quarterfinal	5
1998	Albany State	9–2	5–1	T–2nd		9
1999	Albany State	7–3	4–2	T–3rd		
Albany State:		157–90–4				
Total:		157–90–4				
National championship Conference title Conference division title or championship game berth
