= Dan Land =

American football player and coach (born 1965)

No. 24, 25, 33
- Positions: Running back, safety, cornerback

Personal information
- Born: July 3, 1965 (age 61); Donalsonville, Georgia, U.S.
- Listed height: 6 ft 0 in (1.83 m)
- Listed weight: 195 lb (88 kg)

Career information
- High school: Seminole County
- College: Albany State
- NFL draft: 1987: undrafted

Career history

Playing
- Tampa Bay Buccaneers (1987); Atlanta Falcons (1988)*; Los Angeles Raiders (1989–1991); New York/New Jersey Knights (1992); Los Angeles/Oakland Raiders (1992–1997)
- * Offseason or practice squad member only

Coaching
- Albany State (2002–2014) Assistant coach; Albany State (2015) Interim head coach; Albany State (2016) Head coach

Career NFL statistics
- Rushing yards: 20
- Rushing average: 2.2
- Tackles: 86
- Interceptions: 2
- Fumble recoveries: 2
- Stats at Pro Football Reference

Dan Land (born July 3, 1965) an American football coach and former player. He played professionally in the National Football League (NFL) as a safety with the Tampa Bay Buccaneers and the Los Angeles / Oakland Raiders. He played college football at Albany State University in Albany, Georgia. He was the interim head coach at his alma mater in 2015. In 2016, he had the interim tag removed.

== Head coaching record ==
Year	Team	Overall	Conference	Standing	Bowl/playoffs
Albany State Golden Rams (Southern Intercollegiate Athletic Conference) (2015–2016)
2015	Albany State	6–4	4–0	1st (East)	
2016	Albany State	5–4	3–1	2nd (East)	
Albany State:		11–8	7–1		
Total:		11–8			
National championship Conference title Conference division title or championship game berth
