= Theo Lemon =

American football player and coach (born 1957)

Biographical details
- Born: July 23, 1957 (age 69); Massillon, Ohio, U.S.

Playing career
- 1975–1978: Ohio
- Position: Defensive back

Coaching career (HC unless noted)
- c. 1983: Ohio (assistant)
- 1984: Kentucky State (interim HC/DC)
- 1985–1990: Central State (OH) (DC/LB)
- 1991–1992: Northeastern (DC/LB)
- 1993: East Carolina (DL)
- 1994–1995: Rutgers (LB)
- 1996–2000: Wake Forest (AHC/co-DC)
- 2001–2002: DuPage
- 2005: Central State (OH)
- 2006–2007: Savannah State
- 2015–?: Florida A&M (DC/DL)

Head coaching record
- Overall: 4–26 (college)

Theophulis D. Lemon (born July 23, 1957) is an American football coach and former player. He served as the head football coach at Central State University in 2005, and at Savannah State University from 2006 to 2007; he was also the interim head coach at Kentucky State University for the final three games of the 1984 season.

== Biography ==
=== Playing career ===
Lemon was a four-year starter at defensive back at Ohio University.

=== Coaching career ===
His previous head coaching experiences include Kentucky State University (1984), the College of DuPage (2001–2004) Central State University (2003–2006) and Savannah State University (2006–2007).

He has served as an assistant coach at Kentucky State, Central State, Northeastern University, East Carolina University, Rutgers University and Wake Forest University.

==== Savannah State ====
Lemon entered his first season as head football coach at Savannah State University in 2006 moving from the head coaching position at Central State University. He was relieved of his duties on November 30, 2007 after compiling a 3–18 record in his two seasons as head coach. Lemon was the 20th head football coach at Savannah State University. His annual salary at Savannah State was $65,000.

== Head coaching record ==
=== College ===
| Year | Team | Overall | Conference | Standing | Bowl/playoffs |
|---|---|---|---|---|---|
Kentucky State Thorobreds (NCAA Division II independent) (1984)
| 1984 | Kentucky State | 0–3 (Note: Willie Williamson was the head coach for first eight games of the 1984 season, leading the Thorobreds to a record of 2–6, before he was suspended indefinitely. Lemon was named interim head coach and served for the final three games of the season. Kentucky State finished the year with an overall record of 2–9.) | | | |
| Kentucky State: | | 0–3 | | | |
Central State Marauders () (2005)
| 2005 | Central State | 1–5 | | | |
| Central State: | | 1–5 | | | |
Savannah State Tigers (NCAA Division I FCS independent) (2006–2007)
| 2006 | Savannah State | 2–9 | | | |
| 2007 | Savannah State | 1–9 | | | |
| Savannah State: | | 3–18 | | | |
| Total: | | 4–26 | | | |
