= Albany State Golden Rams football =

College football team for Albany State University

2026 Albany State Golden Rams football team
- First season: 1940; 86 years ago
- Athletic director: Dr. Kristene Kelly
- Head coach: David Bowser; 1st season, 0–0 (–)
- Location: Albany, Georgia
- Stadium: Albany State University Coliseum (capacity: 10,000)
- NCAA division: Division II
- Conference: SIAC
- Colors: Royal blue and gold
- All-time record: 443–311–22 (.585)
- Bowl record: 1–1 (.500)

Conference championships
- 23
- Rivalries: Fort Valley State
- Website: asugoldenrams.com

The Albany State Golden Rams football team represents Albany State University (ASU) in the sport of American football. The Golden Rams compete in the Division II of the National Collegiate Athletic Association (NCAA) and in the Southern Intercollegiate Athletic Conference (SIAC). They play their home games at Albany State University Coliseum on the university's Albany, Georgia, campus, and are currently led by coach Quinn Gray Sr.

In 2003, the Golden Rams played Fayetteville State in the Pioneer Bowl. Albany State won, 52–30.

The Albany State Golden Rams were named the 2010 SBN Black college Football National Champions.

Former Golden Rams players that have played in the NFL include current Indianapolis Colt Grover Stewart, former Golden Rams head coaches Mike White and Dan Land, Steve Carter, Kenneth Gant, Arthur Green, Jeff Hunter, Keyon Nash, Clarence Benford III and Chris Sheffield.

Rapper Rick Ross played briefly for the Golden Rams during the mid-1990s.

== Rivalries ==
=== Fort Valley State University ===
The rivalry began in the first meeting of the two schools in 1945, when FVSU beat ASU, 27–21. The two schools did not play each other in 1946 and 1947. While the rivalry between the two teams spans more than half a century, Fountain City Classic officials moved the game to Columbus in 1990 to attract more corporate support. FVSU leads the series 45–42–4.

Albany State won their last meeting in 2025, 48–3.

== Head coaches ==
Coach	Seasons	Years	Games	W	L	T	Pct.
Chris Roulhac Jr.	4	1947–1950	32	12	15	5	.453
Obie O'Neal	17	1951–1967	146	79	57	10	.575
Bobby Lee	2	1968–1969	17	5	12	0	.294
Willie Parker	1	1970	10	4	6	0	.400
Hampton Smith	24	1971–1976, 1982–1999	251	157	90	4	.633
Whitney L. Van Cleve	3	1977–1979	31	12	17	2	.419
Willie Williamson	2	1980–1981 (first 3 games in 1981)	14	4	10	0	.286
John Wright	1	1981 (last 7 games)	7	0	7	0	.000
Mike White	15	2000–2014	163	112	51	0	.687
Dan Land	2	2015–2016	19	11	8	0	.579
Gabe Giardina	4	2017–2022	54	37	17	0	.685
Quinn Gray	3	2023–2025	35	24	11	0	.686

== Championships ==
=== SEAC ===
6: 1955, 1957, 1959, 1960, 1962, 1966

=== SIAC ===
17: 1984, 1985, 1986, 1988, 1993, 1994, 1995, 1996, 1997, 2003, 2004, 2005, 2006, 2010, 2013, 2021, 2025

=== SIAC East Division ===
2011, 2013, 2014, 2015, 2018, 2019, 2021

=== Black college national ===
2003, 2004, 2010, 2025

== Postseason ==
=== Bowl games ===
Season	Bowl	Opponent	Result
1946	Coconut Bowl	Bethune–Cookman	L 0–32
1952	Tropical Bowl	Bethune–Cookman	L 0–54
2003	Pioneer Bowl	Fayetteville State	W 52–30

=== NCAA Division II playoffs ===
The Golden Rams have made fifteen appearances in the NCAA Division II playoffs, with a combined record of 5–15.

Season	Coach	Playoff	Opponent	Result
1993	Hampton Smith	First Round	Hampton	L 7–33
1994	Hampton Smith	First Round	Valdosta State	L 7–14
1995	Hampton Smith	First Round	North Alabama	L 28–38
1996	Hampton Smith	First Round	Valdosta State	L 28–38
1997	Hampton Smith	First Round; Quarterfinal	Southern Arkansas; Carson–Newman	W 10–6; L 22–23
2004	Mike White	Second Round; Quarterfinal	Arkansas Tech; Valdosta State	W 42–24; L 24–38
2005	Mike White	First Round	Central Arkansas	L 20–28
2006	Mike White	First Round	Newberry	L 28–34
2007	Mike White	First Round	Catawba	L 35–66
2008	Mike White	First Round	Tusculum	L 22–34
2009	Mike White	First Round	West Alabama	L 22–24
2010	Mike White	Second Round; Quarterfinal	Wingate; Delta State	W 30–28; L 7–28
2011	Mike White	First Round	North Greenville	L 14–63
2021	Gabe Giardina	First Round	West Georgia	L 7–23
2025	Quinn Gray	First Round; Regional Semifinals; Regional Finals	Valdosta State; Benedict; Newberry	W 35–30; W 14–12; L 24–31

== All-Americans ==
Year	Player	Pos	Team	Publication	Award
1978	Mike White	DT	3rd Team	AP Little All-America	
1984	Steve Carter	WR	Honorable Mention	AP Little All-America	
1995	Antonio Leroy	RB	3rd Team	AP Little All-America	
2004	Rodney Magwood	OL	2nd Team	AP Little All-America	
2004	Walter Curry	DL	2nd Team	AP Little All-America	
2004	Walter Curry	DL	1st Team	Daktronics	
2005	Alton Pettway	DL	2nd Team	AP Little All-America	
2006	Alton Pettway	DL	1st Team	AFCA	
2006	Alton Pettway	DL	1st Team	AP Little All-America	
2006	Alton Pettway	DL	1st Team	Daktronics	
2011	Jamarkus Gaskins	LB	1st Team	Daktronics	DPOY
2011	Jamarkus Gaskins	LB	1st Team	AP Little All-America	
2013	Dexter Moody	DB	Honorable Mention	Beyond Sports Network	
2014	Jarvis Small	RB	3rd Team	Beyond Sports Network	
2025	Derrick Drayton	DL	2nd Team	AP All-America	

== NFL draft picks ==
Draft	Player	Pos	Team	Round	Pick
1968	Frank Brown	DE	Dallas Cowboys	8th	211
1969	Joe Walker	DE	Boston Patriots	9th	214
1970	Willie Dixon	DB	Buffalo Bills	10th	238
1974	Art Cameron	TE	Buffalo Bills	10th	241
1974	Eddie Wilson	WR	Atlanta Falcons	11th	277
1975	Greg Wells	OL	New York Jets	16th	405
1975	Lester Sherman	RB	Denver Broncos	17th	433
1976	Jeremiah Cummings	DE	Baltimore Colts	14th	394
1979	Mike White	DL	Cincinnati Bengals	4th	84
1979	Curtis Bunche	DL	Philadelphia Eagles	7th	185
1982	George Thompson	WR	Dallas Cowboys	11th	295
1989	Jeff Hunter	DE	Phoenix Cardinals	11th	291
1990	Kenneth Gant	DB	Dallas Cowboys	9th	221
2002	Keyon Nash	DB	Oakland Raiders	6th	189
2017	Grover Stewart	DL	Indianapolis Colts	4th	144

=== Undrafted ===
Players that went undrafted but spent at least one season on a team's active roster.

- Steve Carter: Tampa Bay Buccaneers (1987)
- Arthur Green: New Orleans Saints (1972)
- Dan Land: Tampa Bay Buccaneers (1987), Los Angeles/Oakland Raiders (1989–1997)
- Chris Sheffield: Pittsburgh Steelers (1986–1987), Detroit Lions (1987)
