= John Wright (American football coach) =

American football player and coach (born 1948)

Biographical details
- Born: November 8, 1948 (age 77)

Playing career
- c. 1970: Virginia Union

Coaching career (HC unless noted)
- 1977–1979: Virginia Union (assistant)
- 1980–1981: Albany State (OC)
- 1981: Albany State (interim HC)
- 1984–1985: Norfolk State (OC)
- 1986: Kentucky State
- 1991: Johnson C. Smith
- 1992–1999: Hampton (AHC/OL/ST)
- 2000–2002: Elizabeth City State

Head coaching record
- Overall: 8–47–1

John K. Wright (born November 8, 1948) is an American former football coach. He served as the head football coach at Kentucky State University in 1986, Johnson C. Smith University, in 1991, and Elizabeth City State University from 2000 to 2002; he was also the interim head football coach at Albany State University for the final seven games of the 1981 season following the firing of Willie Williamson. Wright graduated from Virginia Union University in 1971. He coached high school football in Orange and Asbury Park, New Jersey before serving as the offensive coordinator at Norfolk State University in 1984 and 1985.

== Head coaching record ==
Year	Team	Overall	Conference	Standing	Bowl/playoffs
Albany State Golden Rams (Southern Intercollegiate Athletic Conference) (1981)
1981	Albany State	0–7 (Note: Willie Williamson was head coach for the first three games of the season, leading the Golden Rams to a record of 0–3, before he was fired. Wright was named interim head coach and served for the final seven games of the season. Albany State finished the year with an overall record of 0–10.)			
Albany State:		0–7			
Kentucky State Thorobreds (NCAA Division II independent) (1986)
1986	Kentucky State	1–9			
Kentucky State:		1–9			
Johnson C. Smith Golden Bulls (Central Intercollegiate Athletics Association) (1991)
1991	Johnson C. Smith	2–7–1	2–4	7th	
Johnson C. Smith:		2–7–1	2–4		
Elizabeth City State Vikings (Central Intercollegiate Athletics Association) (2000–2002)
2000	Elizabeth City State	1–9	1–6	4th (Eastern)	
2001	Elizabeth City State	2–7	0–6	4th (Eastern)	
2002	Elizabeth City State	2–8	2–5	4th (Eastern)	
Elizabeth City State:		5–24	3–17		
Total:		8–47–1			
