= Chris Roulhac Jr. =

American sports coach, athletics administrator (1917–1997)

Biographical details
- Born: 1917; Memphis, Tennessee, U.S.
- Died: February 12, 1997 (aged 80); Philadelphia, Pennsylvania, U.S.

Playing career

Football
- 1934–1937: LeMoyne

Basketball
- c. 1936: LeMoyne
- Positions: Quarterback (football); Forward (basketball)

Coaching career (HC unless noted)

Football
- 1939: Corbin HS (AR)
- 1941: LeMoyne (assistant)
- 1947–1950: Albany State
- 1968: Cheyney (assistant)

Basketball
- 1940–1942: LeMoyne

Track and field
- 1947–1951: Albany State

Administrative career (AD unless noted)
- 1947–1951: Albany State

Head coaching record
- Overall: 12–15–5 (college football)

Christopher M. Roulhac Jr. (1917 – February 12, 1997) was an American college football, college basketball, and track and field coach. He served as the head football coach at Albany State College—now known as Albany State University—from 1947 to 1950. Roulhac also coached Alice Coachman, who won the gold medal in the women's high jump at the 1948 Summer Olympics, becoming the first African American woman to win an Olympic medal.

Born in Memphis, Tennessee, Roulhac attended LeMoyne College—now known as LeMoyne–Owen College—in his hometown. There he played football as a quarterback and basketball as a forward before graduating in 1938 with a Bachelor of Science degree in biology and chemistry. Roulhac earned a Master of Education degree from Springfield College in 1940.

Roulhac left Albany State in 1951 to become the executive director of the Lauderdale branch of the YMCA in Memphis. In 1957, he was hired as the director of the Columbia North YMCA in Philadelphia. From 1965 to 1984, Roulhac worked for Cheyney University in Cheyney, Pennsylvania as director of admissions and foreign student advisor. In 1968, he served as an assistant coach for the Cheyney Wolves football team under head coach Cleophus Hatcher.

Roulhac died of a cardiac arrest, on February 12, 1997, at Chestnut Hill Hospital in Philadelphia.

== Head coaching record ==
=== College football ===
Year	Team	Overall	Conference	Standing	Bowl/playoffs
Albany State Golden Rams (Southeastern Athletic Conference) (1947–1950)
1947	Albany State	3–4–1	1–3–1	6th	
1948	Albany State	3–3–1			
1949	Albany State	4–4–1			
1950	Albany State	2–5–2			
Albany State:		12–15–5			
Total:		12–15–5			
