= Miller County, Georgia =

County in Georgia, United States

- County
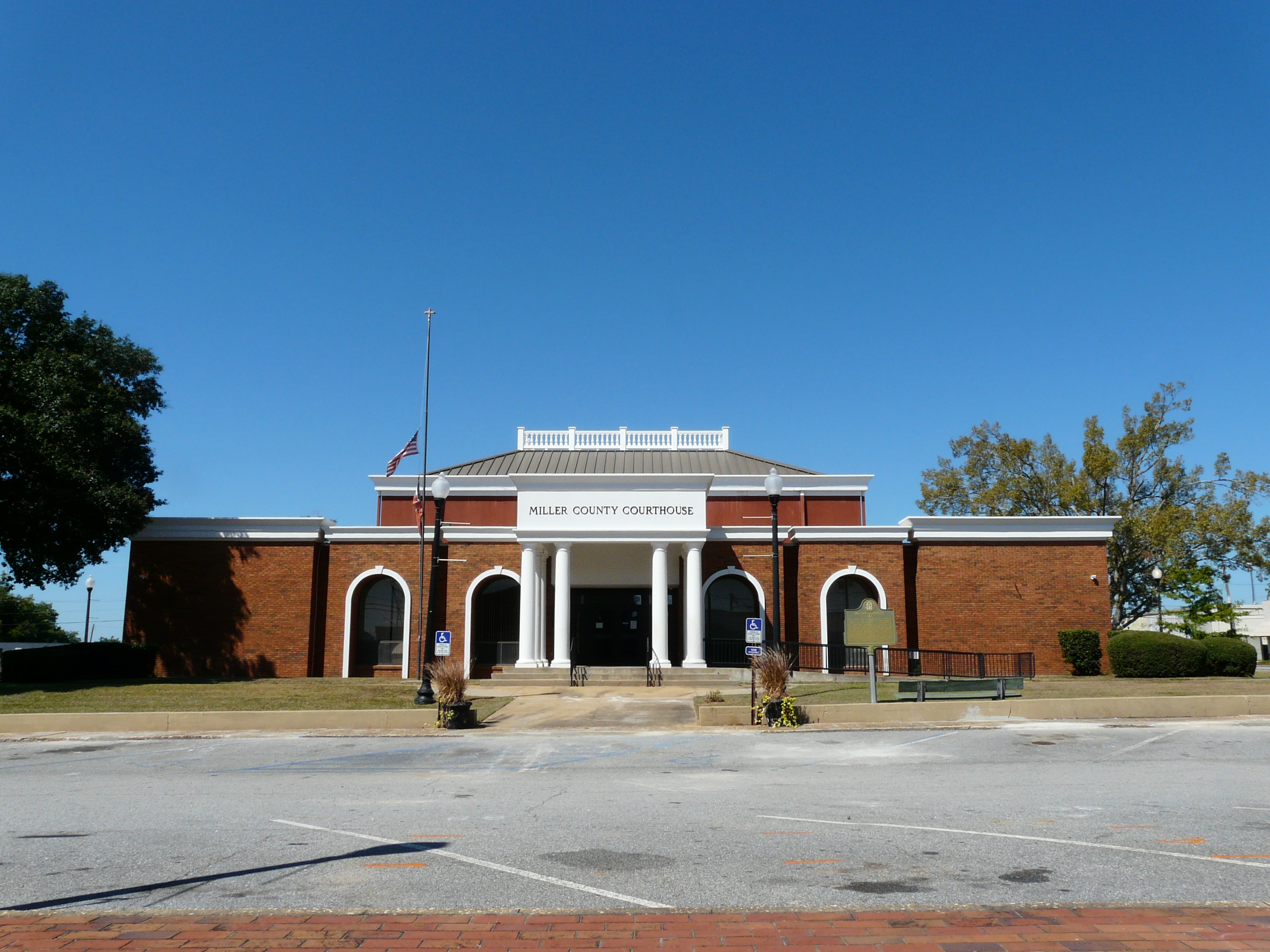
- Miller County Courthouse in Colquitt

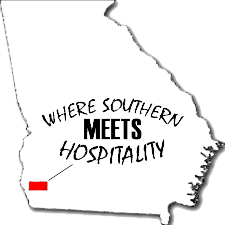
- Seal Logo

- Location within the U.S. state of Georgia
- Coordinates: 31°10′N 84°44′W
- Country: United States
- State: Georgia
- Founded: 1856; 170 years ago
- Named for: Andrew Jackson Miller
- Seat: Colquitt
- Largest city: Colquitt

Area
  - Total: 284 sq mi (740 km^{2})
  - Land: 282 sq mi (730 km^{2})
  - Water: 1.2 sq mi (3.1 km^{2}) 0.4%

Population (2020)
  - Total: 6,000
  - Estimate (2025): 5,812 ▼
  - Density: 21/sq mi (8.1/km^{2})
- Time zone: UTC−5 (Eastern)
  - Summer (DST): UTC−4 (EDT)
- Congressional district: 2nd
- Website: millercountyga.gov

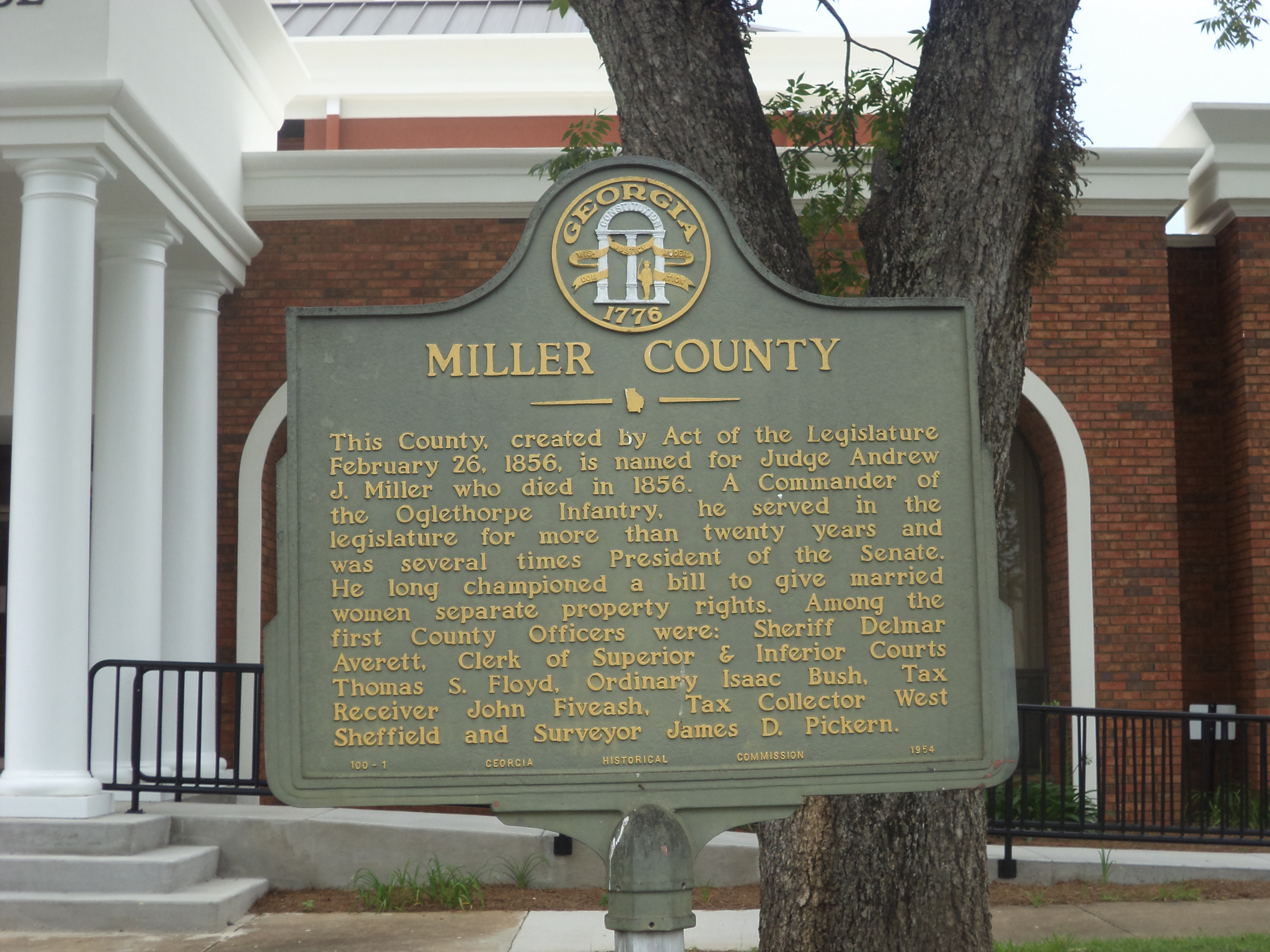
Miller County, Georgia historical marker

Miller County is a county located in the southwestern part of the U.S. state of Georgia. As of the 2020 census, the population was 6,000. The county seat is Colquitt. The county was created on February 26, 1856, and named after Andrew Jackson Miller (1806–56), president of the Medical College of Georgia.

== Geography ==
According to the U.S. Census Bureau, the county has a total area of 284 square miles (740 km^{2}), of which 282 square miles (730 km^{2}) is land and 1.2 square miles (3.1 km^{2}) (0.4%) is water.

The majority of Miller County, west of a north-to-south line made as a continuation of the eastern Early County border, is located in the Spring Creek sub-basin of the ACF River Basin (Apalachicola-Chattahoochee-Flint River Basin). The county's very northeastern corner is located in the Ichawaynochaway Creek sub-basin of the same ACF River Basin, while the southeastern portion, from just north of State Route 91 going south, is located in the Lower Flint River sub-basin of the same larger ACF River Basin.

=== Major highways ===
- U.S. Route 27 / State Route 1
- State Route 39
- State Route 45
- State Route 91
  - State Route 91 Spur
- State Route 273
- State Route 310

=== Adjacent counties ===
- Baker County (northeast)
- Decatur County (southeast)
- Seminole County (southwest)
- Early County (northwest)

== Communities ==
=== City ===
- Colquitt

=== Census-designated place ===
- Boykin

=== Unincorporated communities ===
- Babcock

== Demographics ==
Historical population
Census	Pop.	Note	%±
1860	1,791		—
1870	3,091		72.6%
1880	3,720		20.3%
1890	4,275		14.9%
1900	6,319		47.8%
1910	7,986		26.4%
1920	9,565		19.8%
1930	9,076		−5.1%
1940	9,998		10.2%
1950	9,023		−9.8%
1960	6,908		−23.4%
1970	6,397		−7.4%
1980	7,038		10.0%
1990	6,280		−10.8%
2000	6,383		1.6%
2010	6,125		−4.0%
2020	6,000		−2.0%
2025 (est.)	5,812	▼	−3.1%
U.S. Decennial Census; 1790-1880 1890-1910; 1920-1930 1930-1940; 1940-1950 1960-1980; 1980-2000 2010 2020

=== Racial and ethnic composition ===
Miller County, Georgia – Racial and ethnic composition Note: the US Census treats Hispanic/Latino as an ethnic category. This table excludes Latinos from the racial categories and assigns them to a separate category. Hispanics/Latinos may be of any race.
Race / Ethnicity (NH = Non-Hispanic)	Pop 1980	Pop 1990	Pop 2000	Pop 2010	Pop 2020	% 1980	% 1990	% 2000	% 2010	% 2020
White alone (NH)	5,007	4,524	4,456	4,237	3,949	71.14%	72.04%	69.81%	69.18%	65.82%
Black or African American alone (NH)	1,956	1,725	1,845	1,697	1,748	27.79%	27.47%	28.90%	27.71%	29.13%
Native American or Alaska Native alone (NH)	1	6	11	14	9	0.01%	0.10%	0.17%	0.23%	0.15%
Asian alone (NH)	0	4	2	23	26	0.00%	0.06%	0.03%	0.38%	0.43%
Native Hawaiian or Pacific Islander alone (NH)	x	x	5	0	1	x	x	0.08%	0.00%	0.02%
Other race alone (NH)	0	1	0	0	5	0.00%	0.02%	0.00%	0.00%	0.08%
Mixed race or Multiracial (NH)	x	x	20	61	126	x	x	0.31%	1.00%	2.10%
Hispanic or Latino (any race)	74	20	44	93	136	1.05%	0.32%	0.69%	1.52%	2.27%
Total	7,038	6,280	6,383	6,125	6,000	100.00%	100.00%	100.00%	100.00%	100.00%

=== 2020 census ===
As of the 2020 census, the county had a population of 6,000 people, the median age was 45.5 years, 20.8% were under the age of 18, and 21.2% were 65 years of age or older. For every 100 females there were 90.2 males, and for every 100 females age 18 and over there were 88.4 males age 18 and over; 0.0% of residents lived in urban areas, while 100.0% lived in rural areas.

The racial makeup of the county was 66.4% White, 29.2% Black or African American, 0.2% American Indian and Alaska Native, 0.5% Asian, 0.1% Native Hawaiian and Pacific Islander, 0.9% from some other race, and 2.7% from two or more races. Hispanic or Latino residents of any race comprised 2.3% of the population.

There were 2,537 households, including 1,556 families, recorded in the 2020 census; 28.2% had children under the age of 18 living with them and 31.7% had a female householder with no spouse or partner present. About 32.4% of all households were made up of individuals and 17.8% had someone living alone who was 65 years of age or older.

There were 2,851 housing units, of which 11.0% were vacant. Among occupied housing units, 68.7% were owner-occupied and 31.3% were renter-occupied. The homeowner vacancy rate was 1.0% and the rental vacancy rate was 4.6%.

== Education ==
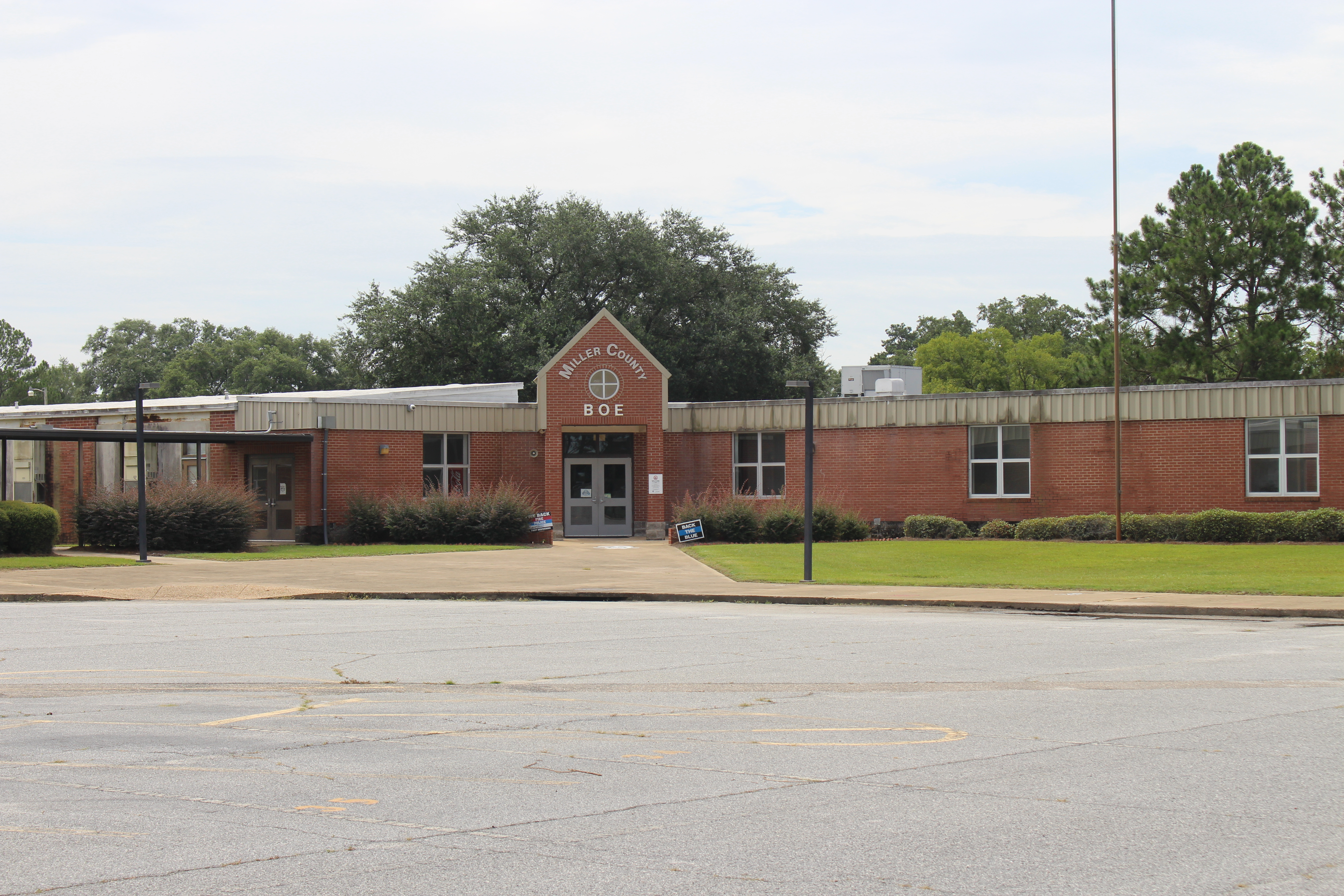
Miller County School District headquarters

The Miller County School District operates public schools serving residents of the county.

== Politics ==
As of the 2020s, Miller County is a Republican stronghold, voting 75% for Donald Trump in 2024. For elections to the United States House of Representatives, Miller County is part of Georgia's 2nd congressional district, currently represented by Sanford Bishop. For elections to the Georgia State Senate, Miller County is part of District 12. For elections to the Georgia House of Representatives, Miller County is part of District 154.

United States presidential election results for Miller County, Georgia
Year	Republican		Democratic		Third party(ies)	
Year	No.	%	No.	%	No.	%
1912	9	5.52%	150	92.02%	4	2.45%
1916	7	1.44%	464	95.47%	15	3.09%
1920	30	16.22%	155	83.78%	0	0.00%
1924	45	24.59%	126	68.85%	12	6.56%
1928	101	23.88%	322	76.12%	0	0.00%
1932	0	0.00%	392	98.99%	4	1.01%
1936	36	5.22%	653	94.64%	1	0.14%
1940	50	6.06%	775	93.94%	0	0.00%
1944	59	6.80%	809	93.20%	0	0.00%
1948	32	3.72%	723	83.97%	106	12.31%
1952	223	12.12%	1,617	87.88%	0	0.00%
1956	441	22.01%	1,563	77.99%	0	0.00%
1960	62	5.26%	1,116	94.74%	0	0.00%
1964	1,658	85.82%	274	14.18%	0	0.00%
1968	249	10.91%	171	7.49%	1,862	81.60%
1972	1,269	91.49%	118	8.51%	0	0.00%
1976	476	23.66%	1,536	76.34%	0	0.00%
1980	900	43.84%	1,127	54.90%	26	1.27%
1984	1,348	71.93%	526	28.07%	0	0.00%
1988	1,105	68.00%	515	31.69%	5	0.31%
1992	826	37.26%	934	42.13%	457	20.61%
1996	847	42.43%	909	45.54%	240	12.02%
2000	1,349	62.74%	783	36.42%	18	0.84%
2004	1,694	69.37%	736	30.14%	12	0.49%
2008	1,899	69.31%	818	29.85%	23	0.84%
2012	1,905	68.53%	852	30.65%	23	0.83%
2016	1,891	74.33%	623	24.49%	30	1.18%
2020	2,066	72.90%	748	26.39%	20	0.71%
2024	2,045	75.07%	670	24.60%	9	0.33%

United States Senate election results for Miller County, Georgia2
Year	Republican		Democratic		Third party(ies)	
Year	No.	%	No.	%	No.	%
2020	2,047	73.61%	687	24.70%	47	1.69%
2020	1,800	73.47%	650	26.53%	0	0.00%

United States Senate election results for Miller County, Georgia3
Year	Republican		Democratic		Third party(ies)	
Year	No.	%	No.	%	No.	%
2020	883	33.41%	271	10.25%	1,489	56.34%
2020	1,803	73.47%	651	26.53%	0	0.00%
2022	1,617	75.28%	509	23.70%	22	1.02%
2022	1,493	77.16%	442	22.84%	0	0.00%

Georgia Gubernatorial election results for Miller County
Year	Republican		Democratic		Third party(ies)	
Year	No.	%	No.	%	No.	%
2022	1,689	78.05%	462	21.35%	13	0.60%

== See also ==
- National Register of Historic Places listings in Miller County, Georgia
- List of counties in Georgia
