= Kathleen Senior High School =

Location
- 1100 Red Devil Way; Lakeland, Polk County, Florida 33805; United States; 28°3′24.6″N 81°59′43.6″W

Information
- School type: Public school
- Motto: "Go Big Red"
- Established: 1928
- School district: Polk County Public Schools
- Principal: Daraford Jones
- Teaching staff: 76.00 (FTE)
- Enrollment: 1,861 (2024-2025)
- Student to teacher ratio: 24.49
- Colors: Red, white and black
- Mascot: Red Devil
- Accreditations: Southern Association of Colleges and Schools
- Website: https://khs.polkschoolsfl.com/

Kathleen Senior High School is the second oldest of four high schools in Lakeland, Florida, United States. It was originally housed north of its present location, at the site of the current Kathleen Middle School.

== Notable alumni ==
- Rashad Anderson, former professional basketball player
- Desmond Clark, former National Football League (NFL) tight end
- Dominique Davis, NFL quarterback (Atlanta Falcons)
- Paul Edinger, former American football kicker in the National Football League (NFL)
- Kenneth Gant, former NFL safety and special teams player for the Dallas Cowboys
- Ray Lewis, former NFL linebacker for the Baltimore Ravens
- Torrian Gray, former NFL free safety for the Minnesota Vikings
- Albert McClellan, former NFL linebacker for the Baltimore Ravens, New England Patriots, and New York Jets
- Alan Mills, Major League Baseball pitcher (1990–2001)
- Freddie Mitchell, former NFL wide receiver for the Philadelphia Eagles
- Chris Richard, professional basketball forward
- Forrest Sawyer, Emmy Award-winning journalist
- Donnell Smith, former NFL player for the Green Bay Packers and New England Patriots
- Ronnie Smith, former wide receiver for the Los Angeles Rams, San Diego Chargers and Philadelphia Eagles
