= Willie Williamson =

American football player and coach (1944–2021)

Biographical details
- Born: November 23, 1944; Detroit, Michigan, U.S.
- Died: August 7, 2021 (aged 76)

Playing career
- 1963–1967: Anderson (IN)
- Positions: Running back, defensive back

Coaching career (HC unless noted)
- 1976–1979: Virginia Union (assistant)
- 1980–1981: Albany State
- 1983: Winston-Salem State (assistant)
- 1984: Kentucky State
- 1989: Norfolk Catholic HS (VA)
- 1992: Ferguson HS (VA) (volunteer assistant)
- 1993: Surry County HS (VA)

Head coaching record
- Overall: 6–16 (college)

Willie A. Williamson Jr. (November 23, 1944 – August 7, 2021) was an American football coach. He served as head football coach at Albany State University from 1980 to 1981 and at Kentucky State University in 1984, compiling a career college football head coaching record of 6–16.

Williamson attended high school in Detroit, Michigan and played college football as a running back and defensive back at Anderson College—now known as Anderson University—in Anderson, Indiana. He played semi-pro football for three seasons with the Los Angeles Mustangs of the Western Professional League. Williamson was suspended indefinitely from his post at Kentucky State in late October 1984 after criticizing the team's schedule. He was replaced by Theo Lemon as interim head coach.

Williamson died on August 7, 2021.

== Head coaching record ==
=== College ===
| Year | Team | Overall | Conference | Standing | Bowl/playoffs |
|---|---|---|---|---|---|
Albany State Golden Rams (Southern Intercollegiate Athletic Conference) (1980–1981)
| 1980 | Albany State | 4–7 | | | |
| 1981 | Albany State | 0–3 (Note: Williamson was fired after the first three games of the 1981 season. John Wright was named interim head and led the Golden Rams to a record of 0–7 over the final seven games of the season. Albany State finished the year with an overall record of 0–10.) | | | |
| Albany State: | | 4–10 | | | |
Kentucky State Thorobreds (NCAA Division II independent) (1984)
| 1984 | Kentucky State | 2–6 (Note: Williamson was suspended indefinitely after the first eight games of the 1984 season. Theo Lemon was named interim head coach and led the Thorobreds to a record of 0–3 over the final three games of the season. Kentucky State finished the year with an overall record of 2–9.) | | | |
| Kentucky State: | | 2–6 | | | |
| Total: | | 6–16 | | | |
