= Keyon Nash =

American football player (born 1979)

No. 42
- Position: Safety

Personal information
- Born: March 11, 1979 (age 47); Colquitt, Georgia, U.S.
- Listed height: 6 ft 3 in (1.91 m)
- Listed weight: 215 lb (98 kg)

Career information
- High school: Miller County (Colquitt)
- College: Albany State
- NFL draft: 2002: 6th round, 189th overall pick

Career history
- Oakland Raiders (2002–2005); → Rhein Fire (2005); Toronto Argonauts (2007)*
- * Offseason or practice squad member only

Career NFL statistics
- Total tackles: 1
- Stats at Pro Football Reference

DeRodick "Keyon" Nash (born March 11, 1979) is an American former professional football player who was a safety for the Oakland Raiders of the National Football League (NFL). He was selected by the Raiders in the 2002 NFL draft. He played college football for the Albany State Golden Rams.

He was also a member of the Rhein Fire and Toronto Argonauts.

== Early life ==
Nash attended Miller County High School in Colquitt, Georgia.

== Professional career ==
=== Oakland Raiders ===
Nash was selected by the Oakland Raiders in the sixth round (189th overall) of the 2002 NFL draft.

=== Toronto Argonauts ===
Nash signed with the Toronto Argonauts of the Canadian Football League on April 26, 2007, but was released on June 19, 2007.
