= Babcock, Georgia =

Unincorporated community in Georgia, U.S.

Coordinates: 31°06′45″N 84°38′30″W

Babcock is an unincorporated community in Miller County, in the U.S. state of Georgia.

== History ==
An old variant name was "Pondtown". A post office called Babcock was established in 1902, and remained in operation until 1924. The present name is after three first settlers: brothers E. V., Fred R. and Oscar H. Babcock. Babcock was incorporated by the Georgia General Assembly in 1901. The town was officially dissolved in 1995.
