= Steve Carter (American football) =

American football player (born 1962)

Profile
- Position: Wide receiver

Personal information
- Born: September 12, 1962 (age 64); New York City, US

Career information
- College: Albany State
- NFL draft: 1987: undrafted

Career history
- Tampa Bay Buccaneers (1987)

Career NFL statistics
- Games played: 3
- Receptions: 1
- Receiving yards: 12
- Stats at Pro Football Reference

Steven Edward Carter (born September 12, 1962) is a professional American football wide receiver in the National Football League who played for the Tampa Bay Buccaneers in 1987 at the age of 25. The 5'10" 170 pounds receiver played college football at Albany State University in Albany, Georgia.
