= Miller County School District =

School district in Georgia (U.S. state)

Address
- 96 Perry Street Colquitt, Georgia, 39837-3608; United States
- Coordinates: 31.175983°N 84.733349°W

District information
- Grades: Pre-Kindergarten – 12
- Superintendent: Michael Keown
- Accreditation(s): Southern Association of Colleges and Schools; Georgia Accrediting Commission

Students and staff
- Enrollment: 735 (2022–23)
- Faculty: 59.50 (FTE)

Other information
- Telephone: (229) 758-5592
- Fax: (229) 758-3255
- Website: miller.k12.ga.us

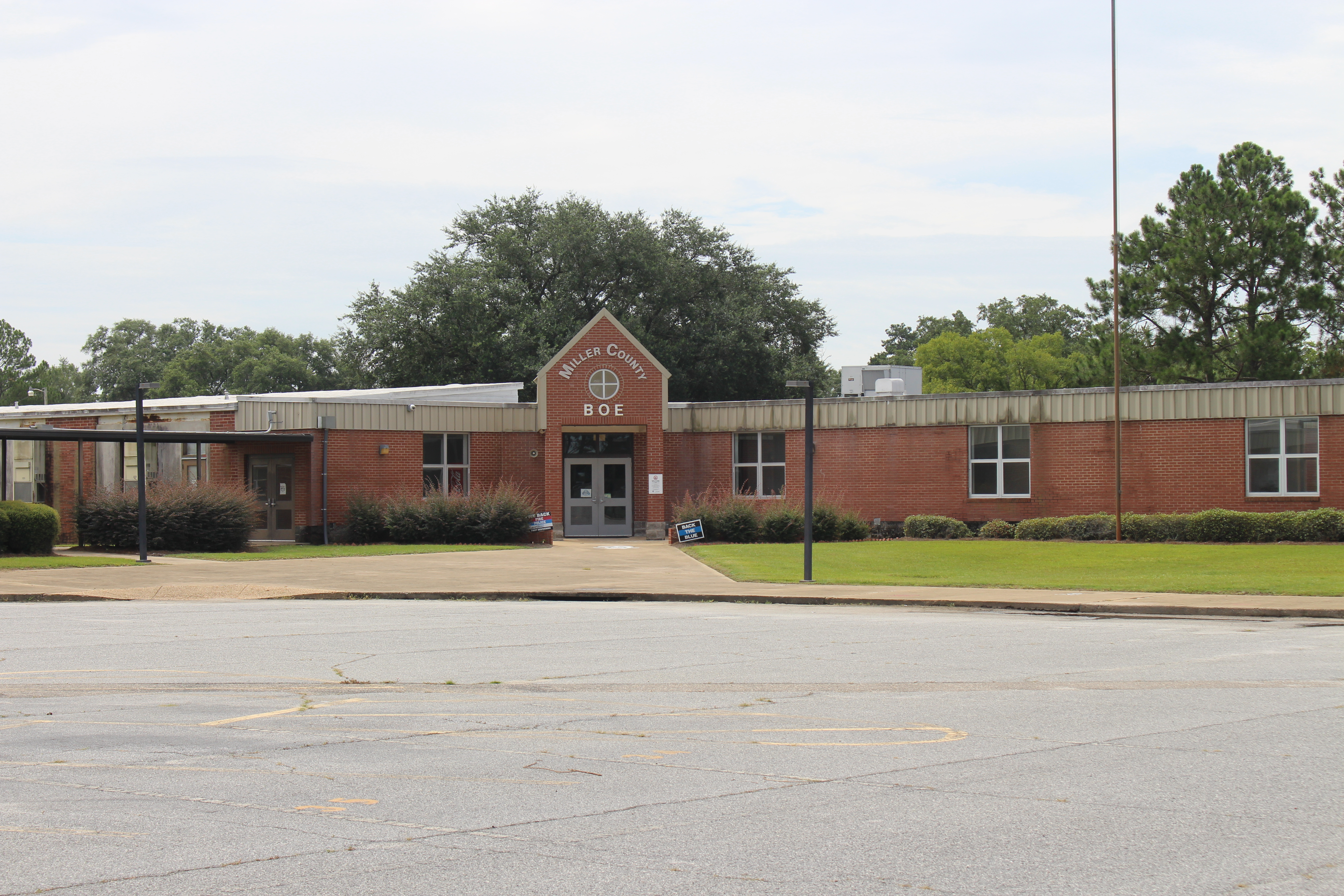
School district headquarters

The Miller County School District is a public school district in Miller County, Georgia, United States, based in Colquitt. It serves the communities of Boykin and Colquitt.

== Schools ==
The Miller County School District has one elementary school, one middle school, and one high school.

=== Elementary school ===
- Miller County Elementary School

=== Middle school ===
- Miller County Middle School

=== High school ===
- Miller County High School

== Gallery ==
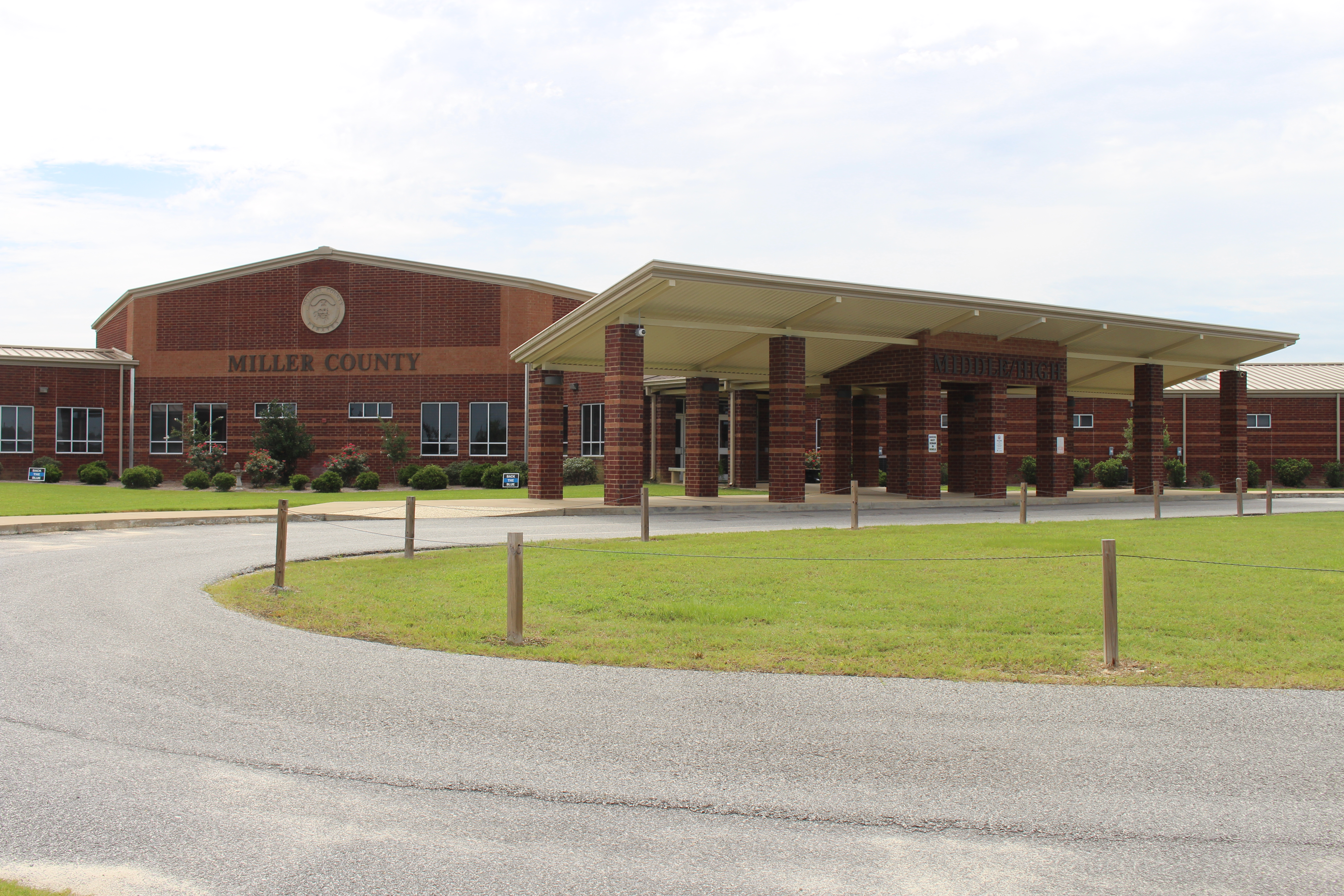
Miller County school complex middle-high school entrance

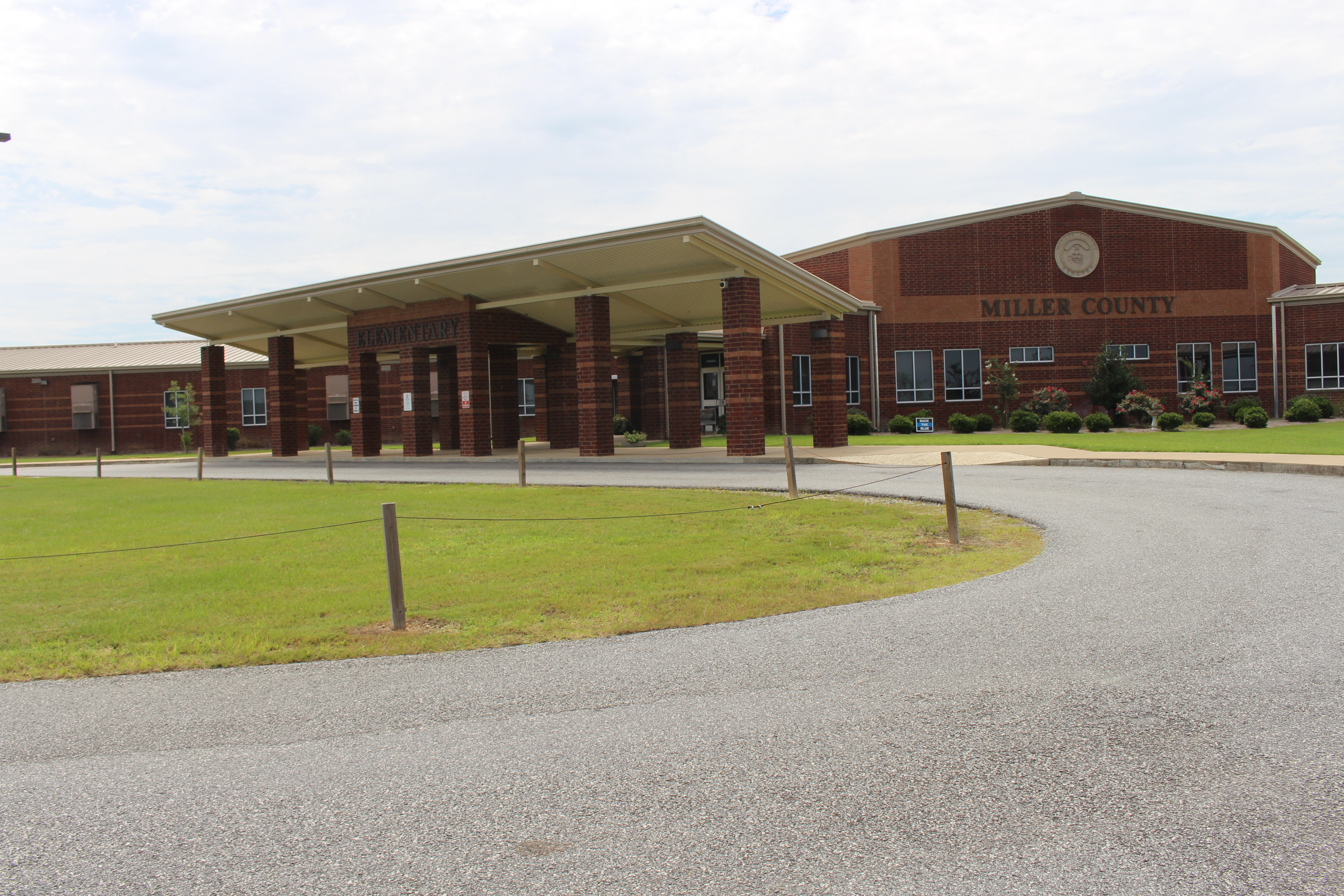
Miller County school complex elementary school entrance

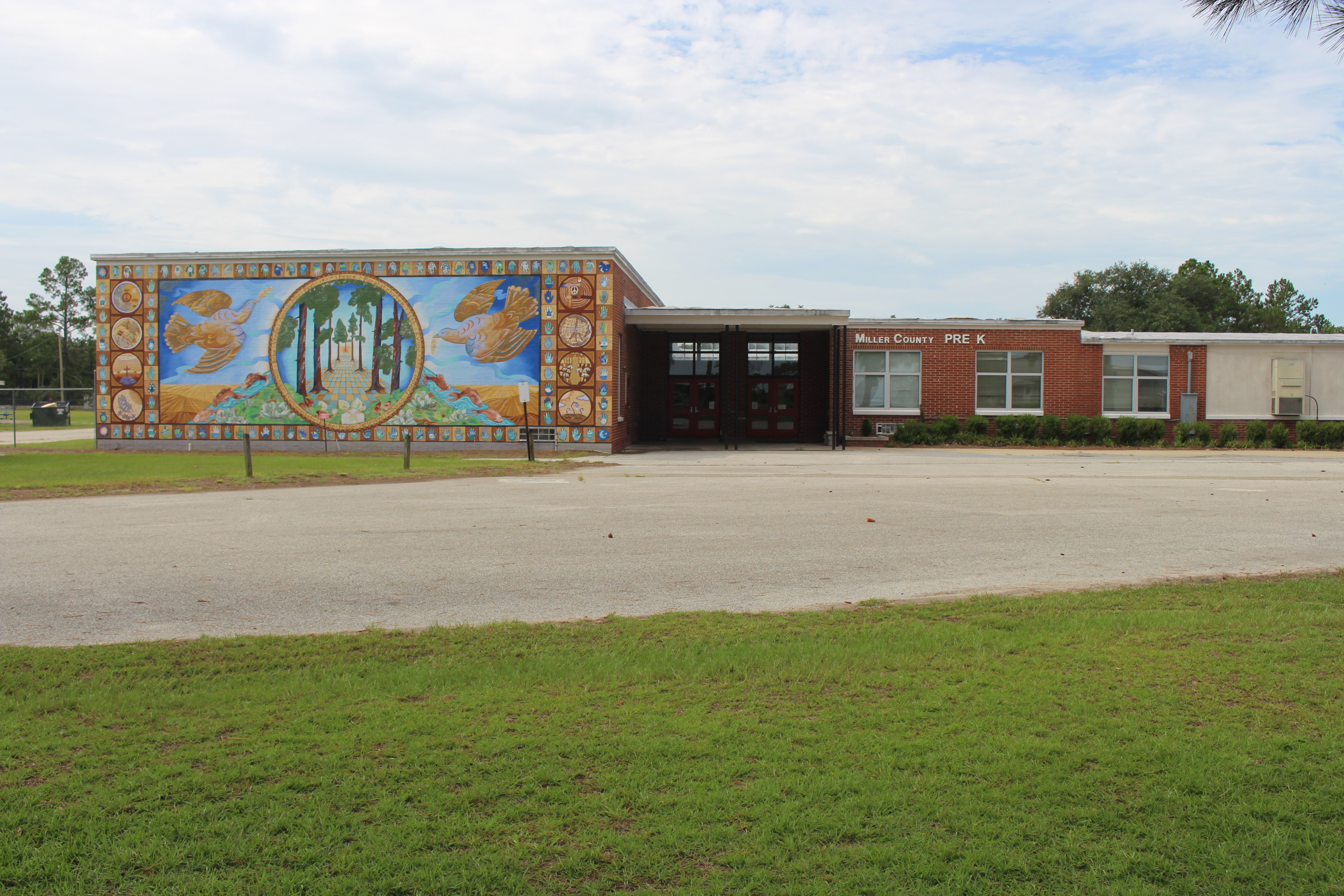
Miller County Pre-Kindergarten Building
