= Colquitt Town Square Historic District =

Historic district in Georgia, United States

- U.S. National Register of Historic Places
- U.S. Historic district
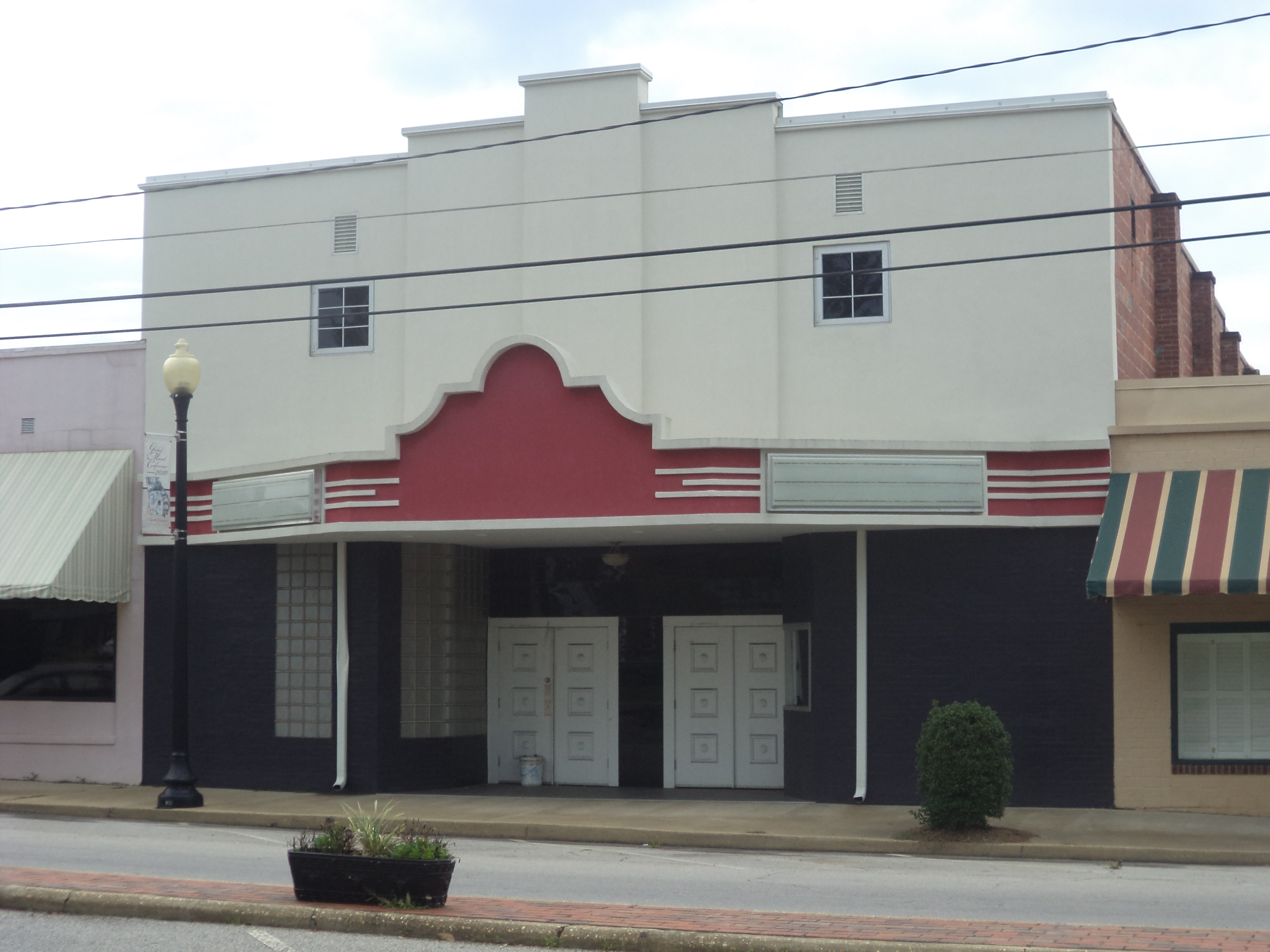
- The former Colquitt Theater, in 2013, also known as Hunter Theater

- Location within Georgia
- Location: Cuthbert, 1st, College, and Main Sts., Colquitt, Georgia
- Area: 16 acres (6.5 ha)
- Architectural style: Early Commercial, Late Victorian
- NRHP reference No.: 83000237
- Added to NRHP: March 31, 1983

The Colquitt Town Square Historic District in Colquitt, Georgia is a 16-acre (6.5 ha) historic district that included 35 contributing buildings when it was listed on the National Register of Historic Places in 1983. The district includes the historic courthouse square and buildings on all four sides of it.

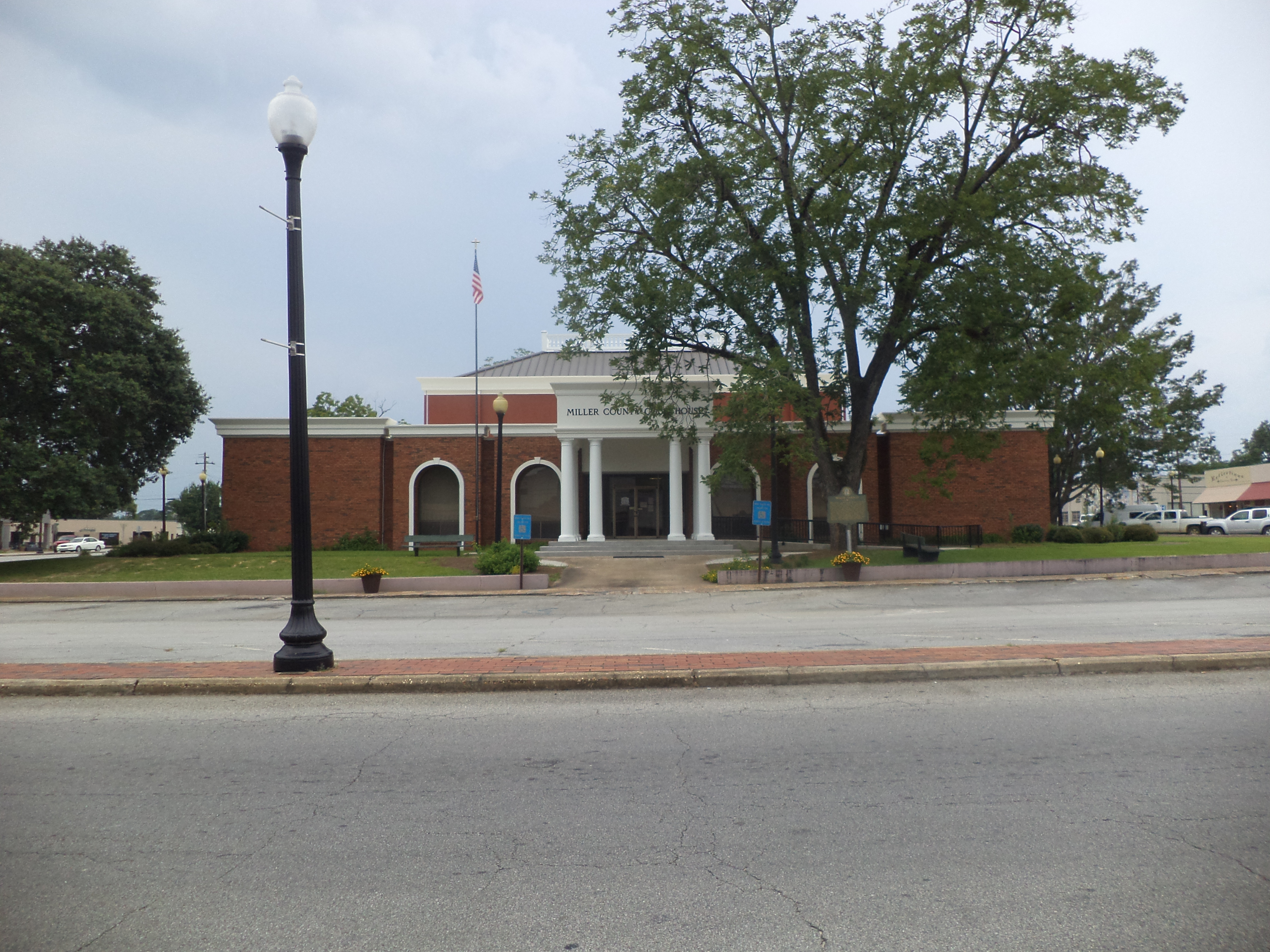
Miller County Courthouse

The original, historic courthouse was destroyed by fire in the 1970s, and a replacement courthouse, the Miller County Courthouse stands in its stead, on the square. This courthouse does not itself contribute to the history of the district.
