= Kenneth Gant =

American football player (born 1967)

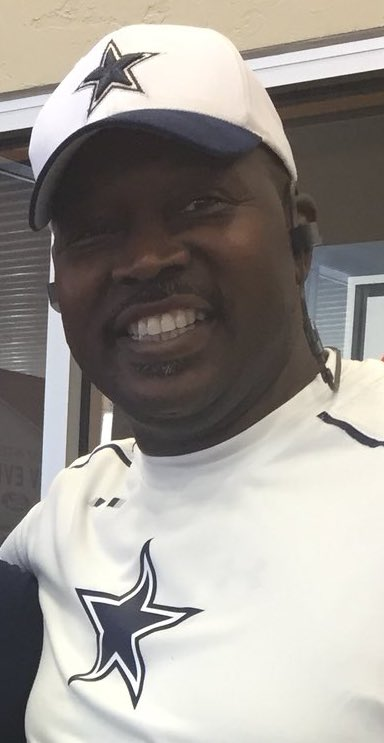
- Gant in 2019

No. 29
- Position: Safety

Personal information
- Born: April 18, 1967 (age 59); Bartow, Florida, U.S.
- Listed height: 5 ft 11 in (1.80 m)
- Listed weight: 187 lb (85 kg)

Career information
- High school: Kathleen (Lakeland, Florida)
- College: Albany State (GA)
- NFL draft: 1990: 9th round, 221st overall pick

Career history
- Dallas Cowboys (1990–1994); Tampa Bay Buccaneers (1995–1997)

Awards and highlights
- 2× Super Bowl champion (XXVII, XXVIII); Second-team All-SIAC (1989)

Career NFL statistics
- Tackles: 159
- Interceptions: 7
- Fumble recoveries: 3
- Stats at Pro Football Reference

Kenneth Dwayne Gant (born April 18, 1967) is an American former professional football player who was a safety in the National Football League (NFL) for the Dallas Cowboys and Tampa Bay Buccaneers. He was a member of the Super Bowl XXVII and Super Bowl XXVIII teams that defeated the Buffalo Bills. He played college football for the Albany State Golden Rams.

== Early life ==
Gant attended Kathleen High School in Lakeland, Florida. He received a football scholarship from Albany State University, where although he came in as an offensive player, he was converted to the defensive side and became a four-year starter at cornerback.

As a freshman, he posted 15 tackles, 3 interceptions and one pass defensed. As a sophomore, he tallied 33 tackles, 3 interceptions and 6 passes defensed. As a junior, he recorded 55 tackles, 3 sacks and 6 passes defensed. He also made 7 tackles against Fort Valley State University.

As senior, he registered 55 tackles, 5 interceptions (third in the conference) and one blocked punt. He had 6 tackles and one interception against Savannah State University. In his college career he only missed one game, finishing with 158 tackles, 14 interceptions, 17 passes defensed and 4 fumble recoveries.

== Professional career ==
=== Dallas Cowboys ===
Gant was selected by the Dallas Cowboys in the ninth round (221st overall) of the 1990 NFL draft. During training camp he was tried at cornerback, but the team eventually moved him to safety. As a rookie, he was activated from the injured reserve list on October 1.

In 1991, from his gunner position he led the Cowboys special teams with 25 tackles (18 solo). He also registered 14 defensive tackles and 3 passes defensed. He started at left cornerback in the eleventh game against the New York Giants. He was a kickoff returner in the last 9 games of the season.

In 1992, he was moved from cornerback to strong safety and the defense led the NFL in preventing third-down conversions, allowing opponents a conversion rate of 27.2 percent. He finished with 13 special teams tackles (second on the team), three sacks, nine quarterback pressures, three interceptions (tied for the team lead), three forced fumbles (tied for the team lead), 10 passes defensed, one blocked punt and led backup players in defensive tackles (54). In 1993, he was third on the team with 17 special teams tackles. He also was a kickoff returner in the first 4 games of the season. In the playoffs against the Atlanta Falcons, he forced 2 fumbles in the third quarter to help set up 2 touchdowns.

In 1993, he missed most of training camp after suffering a separated left shoulder in preseason against the Detroit Lions. He played in 12 games, collecting 17 special teams tackles (fourth on the team), one interception, 11 passes defensed (second on the team) and led backup players in defensive tackles (43).

In 1994, he had 15 special teams tackles, one interception, 4 passes defensed and 15 defensive tackles.

Gant was a member of the Cowboys Super Bowl XXVII and Super Bowl XXVIII championship teams. He was nicknamed "The Shark" because during the 1992 season, before every kickoff and after making big plays, he would perform a celebratory dance dubbed "The Shark Dance". Typically, he would strut around, flapping his elbows while holding his hand over his head to simulate a shark's dorsal fin, a move that he learned from teammate Kevin Smith, who called it "the Shark Fin" from his days at Texas A&M University, where defensive backs used it to celebrate.

=== Tampa Bay Buccaneers ===
On March 23, 1995, Gant signed as a free agent with the Tampa Bay Buccaneers. He appeared in 16 games with 3 starts, collecting 28 defensive tackles, 2 passes defensed and 11 special teams tackles (second on the team).

In 1996, he appeared in 16 games as a backup, tallying 11 special teams tackles (third on the team). In 1997, he appeared in 9 games as a backup, registering 4 special teams tackles. He was waived on November 28.

In 1999, Gant played for the Mobile Admirals in the short-lived Regional Football League.

== Personal life ==
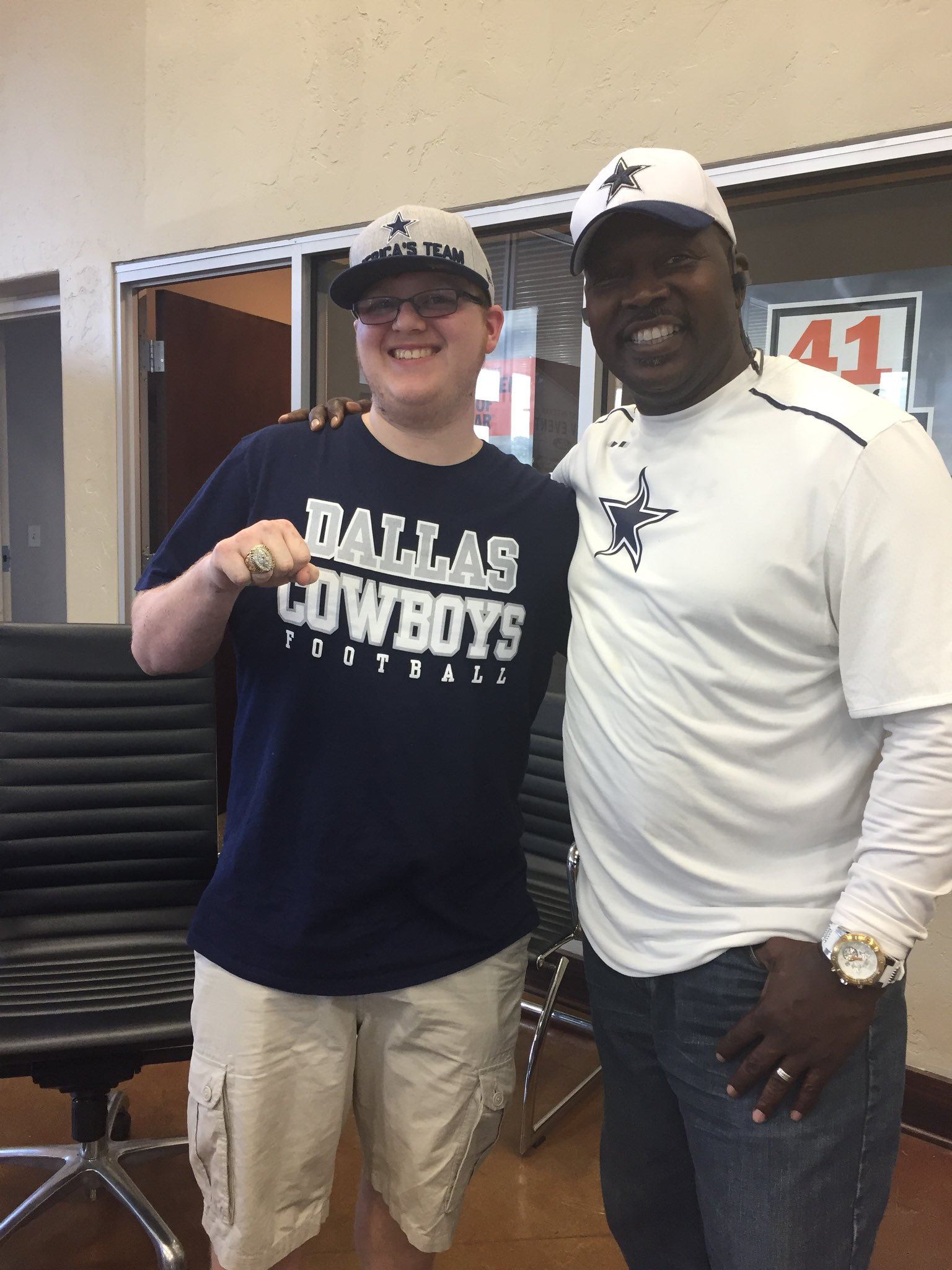
Gant with a fan in 2019

Gant is married and has two children. He resides in Dallas, Texas, where he is the founder and pastor of Faith Works Ministries International.
