= Grover Stewart =

American football player (born 1993)

No. 90 – Indianapolis Colts
- Position: Defensive tackle
- Roster status: Active

Personal information
- Born: October 20, 1993 (age 33); Camilla, Georgia, U.S.
- Listed height: 6 ft 4 in (1.93 m)
- Listed weight: 314 lb (142 kg)

Career information
- High school: Mitchell County (Camilla)
- College: Albany State (2013–2016)
- NFL draft: 2017: 4th round, 144th overall pick

Career history
- Indianapolis Colts (2017–present)

Awards and highlights
- Black College Football Pro Player of the Year Award (2021)

Career NFL statistics as of Week 5, 2026
- Total tackles: 426
- Sacks: 13.5
- Forced fumbles: 3
- Fumble recoveries: 2
- Pass deflections: 15
- Interceptions: 1
- Stats at Pro Football Reference

Grover Stewart (born October 20, 1993) is an American professional football defensive tackle for the Indianapolis Colts of the National Football League (NFL). He played college football for the Albany State Golden Rams.

== Professional career ==
Pre-draft measurables
| Height | Weight | Arm length | Hand span | Wingspan | 40-yard dash | 10-yard split | 20-yard split | 20-yard shuttle | Three-cone drill | Vertical jump | Broad jump | Bench press |
|---|---|---|---|---|---|---|---|---|---|---|---|---|
| 6 ft 4 3/8 in (1.94 m) | 334 lb (151 kg) | 33 1/4 in (0.84 m) | 9 3/8 in (0.24 m) | 6 ft 7 5/8 in (2.02 m) | 5.14 s | 1.73 s | 2.89 s | 4.75 s | 7.71 s | 26.0 in (0.66 m) | 8 ft 10 in (2.69 m) | 30 reps |
All values from Pro Day

Stewart was selected by the Indianapolis Colts in the fourth round, 144th overall, in the 2017 NFL draft. As a rookie, he finished with 23 total tackles (12 solo) in 14 games.

After being a backup in his first two seasons, Stewart became a full-time starter in 2019. He had his first career sack in Week 2 of 2019. He finished the season playing in all 16 games with 13 starts, recording three sacks, 30 tackles and a pass deflection.

On November 28, 2020, Stewart signed a three-year, $30.75 million contract extension through the 2023 season.

On October 17, 2023, Stewart was suspended six games for violating the NFL policy on performance-enhancing drugs. He finished the season with 41 tackles and 0.5 sacks through 11 starts.

On March 11, 2024, the Colts signed Stewart to a three-year, $39 million contract extension.

== NFL career statistics ==
Legend
| **Bold** | Career high |

=== Regular season ===
| Year | Team | Games | | Tackles | | | | | Interceptions | | | | | | Fumbles | | | | |
| Year | Team | GP | GS | Cmb | Solo | Ast | Sck | TFL | Int | Yds | Avg | Lng | TD | PD | FF | Fmb | FR | Yds | TD |
|---|---|---|---|---|---|---|---|---|---|---|---|---|---|---|---|---|---|---|---|
| 2017 | IND | 15 | 0 | 23 | 12 | 11 | 0.0 | 1 | 0 | 0 | 0.0 | 0 | 0 | 0 | 0 | 0 | 0 | 0 | 0 |
| 2018 | IND | 15 | 1 | 17 | 8 | 9 | 0.0 | 2 | 0 | 0 | 0.0 | 0 | 0 | 0 | 0 | 0 | 0 | 0 | 0 |
| 2019 | IND | 16 | 13 | 30 | 14 | 16 | 3.0 | 5 | 0 | 0 | 0.0 | 0 | 0 | 1 | 0 | 0 | 0 | 0 | 0 |
| 2020 | IND | 16 | 16 | 53 | 40 | 13 | 0.5 | 6 | 0 | 0 | 0.0 | 0 | 0 | 1 | 0 | 0 | 0 | 0 | 0 |
| 2021 | IND | 17 | 17 | 46 | 23 | 23 | 1.0 | 2 | 0 | 0 | 0.0 | 0 | 0 | 2 | **1** | 0 | 0 | 0 | 0 |
| 2022 | IND | 17 | 17 | 70 | **44** | 26 | **4.0** | 9 | 0 | 0 | 0.0 | 0 | 0 | 3 | 0 | 0 | **1** | 0 | 0 |
| 2023 | IND | 11 | 11 | 41 | 23 | 18 | 0.5 | 5 | 0 | 0 | 0.0 | 0 | 0 | 0 | 0 | 0 | 0 | 0 | 0 |
| 2024 | IND | 17 | 17 | **74** | 29 | **45** | 3.5 | **10** | 0 | 0 | 0.0 | 0 | 0 | 3 | **1** | 0 | **1** | 0 | 0 |
| 2025 | IND | 17 | 17 | 55 | 23 | 32 | 0.5 | 5 | **1** | **3** | **3.0** | **3** | 0 | **4** | **1** | 0 | 0 | 0 | 0 |
| 2026 | IND | 5 | 5 | 17 | 5 | 12 | 0.5 | 2 | 0 | 0 | 0.0 | 0 | 0 | 1 | 0 | 0 | 0 | 0 | 0 |
| Career | | 146 | 114 | 426 | 221 | 205 | 13.5 | 47 | 1 | 3 | 3.0 | 3 | 0 | 15 | 3 | 0 | 2 | 0 | 0 |

=== Postseason ===
| Year | Team | Games | | Tackles | | | | | Interceptions | | | | | | Fumbles | | | | |
| Year | Team | GP | GS | Cmb | Solo | Ast | Sck | TFL | Int | Yds | Avg | Lng | TD | PD | FF | Fmb | FR | Yds | TD |
|---|---|---|---|---|---|---|---|---|---|---|---|---|---|---|---|---|---|---|---|
| 2018 | IND | 2 | 0 | **2** | 1 | **1** | **0.5** | 0 | 0 | 0 | 0.0 | 0 | 0 | 0 | 0 | 0 | 0 | 0 | 0 |
| 2020 | IND | 1 | 1 | **2** | **2** | 0 | 0.0 | 0 | 0 | 0 | 0.0 | 0 | 0 | 0 | 0 | 0 | 0 | 0 | 0 |
| Career | | 3 | 1 | 4 | 3 | 1 | 0.5 | 0 | 0 | 0 | 0.0 | 0 | 0 | 0 | 0 | 0 | 0 | 0 | 0 |
