= Jeff Hunter (American football) =

American gridiron football player (born 1966)

No. 98, 97
- Position: Defensive end

Personal information
- Born: April 12, 1966 (age 60); Hampton, Virginia, U.S.
- Listed height: 6 ft 5 in (1.96 m)
- Listed weight: 286 lb (130 kg)

Career information
- High school: Hephzibah (Hephzibah, Georgia)
- College: Albany State
- NFL draft: 1989: 11th round, 291st overall pick

Career history
- Phoenix Cardinals (1989)*; Buffalo Bills (1990); Detroit Lions (1990–1992); Miami Dolphins (1992–1993); Tampa Bay Buccaneers (1994); Houston Oilers (1995)*; Winnipeg Blue Bombers (1995); London Monarchs (1996–1997)
- * Offseason or practice squad member only
- Stats at Pro Football Reference

Jeffrey Orlando Hunter (born April 12, 1966) is an American former professional football defensive lineman. In a career lasting almost a decade, he played five seasons for four teams in the National Football League (NFL), as well as in the Canadian Football League (CFL) and the World League of American Football (WLAF). Hunter played college football at Albany State University in Albany, Georgia.

== Professional career ==
Hunter was selected by the Phoenix Cardinals with the 12th pick in the 11th round (291st overall) of the 1989 NFL draft. He was traded to the Buffalo Bills before the beginning of the 1990 season, where he played in 3 games before being traded midseason to the Detroit Lions. Hunter played in a total of 27 games between 1990 and 1992 before being traded to the Miami Dolphins, where he played in 7 games in 1992 and 5 games in 1993. He played 1 game with the Tampa Bay Buccaneers in 1995. Hunter had 12 sacks during his entire NFL career.

Hunter played in two games with the Winnipeg Blue Bombers of the Canadian Football League in 1995.

From 1996 to 1997, Hunter played for the London Monarchs of the World League of American Football, where he recorded 4 sacks and at least one blocked punt.

== Coaching career ==
Hunter presently resides in Leesburg, Georgia and is a defensive line coach for the Lee County Middle School East Trojans (Leesburg, GA)
