= George Thompson (American football) =

American football player (1899–1939)

Profile
- Positions: Guard, tackle

Personal information
- Born: September 26, 1899
- Died: September 19, 1939 (aged 39); Ohio
- Listed height: 6 ft 1 in (1.85 m)
- Listed weight: 210 lb (95 kg)

Career information
- High school: Fort Dodge (IA)
- College: Iowa

Career history
- Rock Island Independents (1923–1925)

Career statistics
- Games: 27

George Delmar Thompson (September 26, 1899 – September 19, 1939) was an American football player. He played college football for Iowa and professional football in the National Football League (NFL) as a guard and tackle for the Rock Island Independents from 1923 to 1925. He appeared in 27 NFL games, 25 as a starter.
