= Colquitt, Georgia =

- City
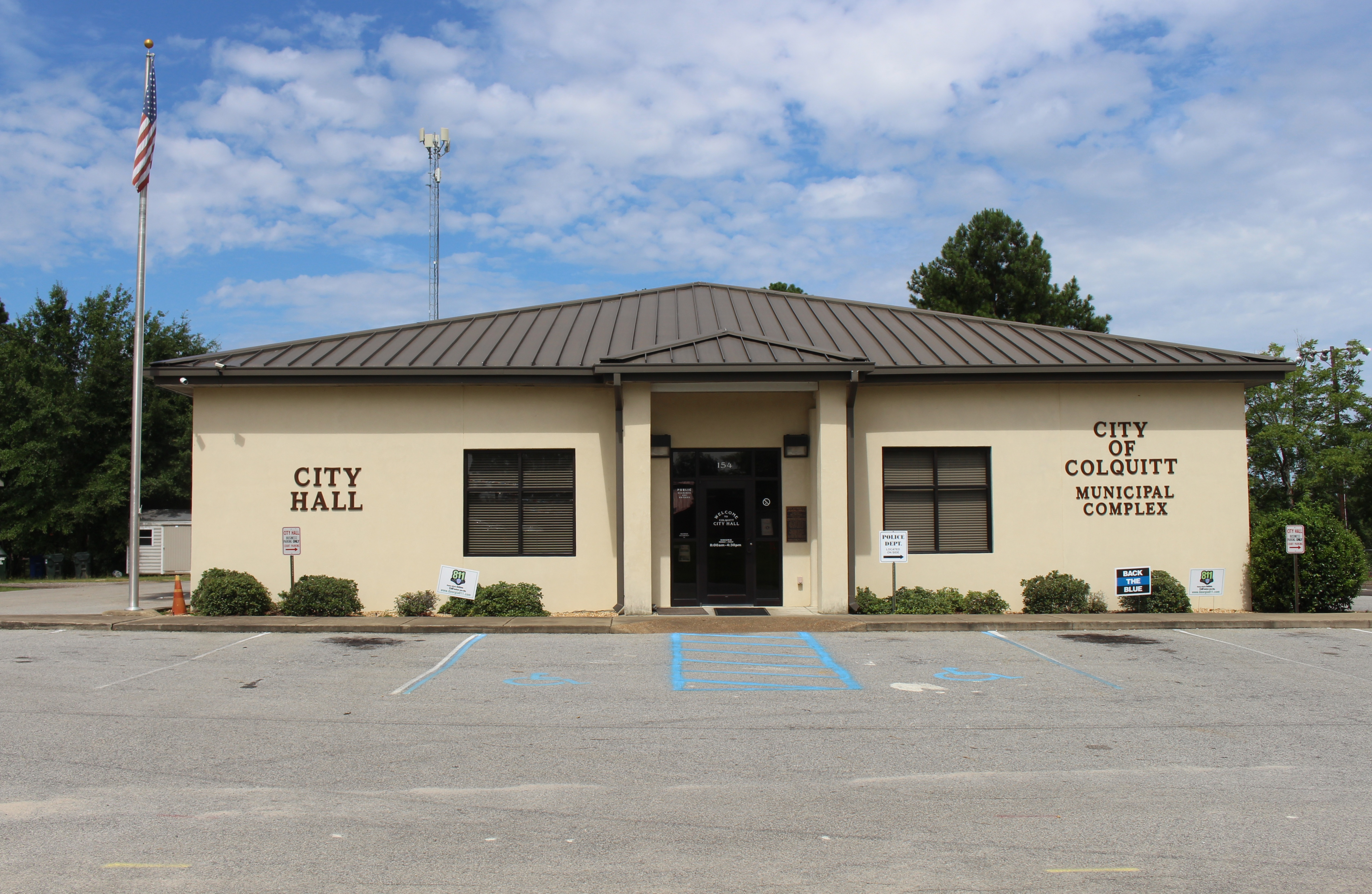
- Colquitt City Hall

- Seal

- Location in Miller County and the state of Georgia
- Coordinates: 31°10′23″N 84°43′43″W
- Country: United States
- State: Georgia
- County: Miller
- Incorporated (City): December 19, 1860

Area
  - Total: 8.27 sq mi (21.42 km^{2})
  - Land: 8.23 sq mi (21.32 km^{2})
  - Water: 0.039 sq mi (0.10 km^{2})
- Elevation: 167 ft (51 m)

Population (2020)
  - Total: 2,001
  - Density: 243.1/sq mi (93.85/km^{2})
- Time zone: UTC-5 (Eastern (EST))
  - Summer (DST): UTC-4 (EDT)
- ZIP code: 39837
- Area code: 229
- FIPS code: 13-18000
- GNIS feature ID: 0355248

Colquitt is a city and the county seat of Miller County, in the southwestern portion of the U.S. state of Georgia. The population was 2,001 at the 2020 census. Colquitt has been the county seat of Miller County since Miller County was incorporated by the Georgia Legislature in 1856. The city formally incorporated on December 19, 1860, and is Miller County's only incorporated municipality. Colquitt is named for U.S. Congressman and Senator Walter Terry Colquitt.

The Colquitt Town Square Historic District was added to the National Register of Historic Places in 1983.

== Geography ==
Colquitt is located in the center of Miller County at 31°10′23″N 84°43′43″W (31.173090, -84.728512).

The city is located along U.S. Route 27, Georgia State Route 45, and Georgia State Route 91 in southwestern Georgia. U.S. 27 runs northwest–southeast through the center of town as Crawford Street, leading northwest 21 mi (34 km) to Blakely and southeast 22 mi (35 km) to Bainbridge. GA-45 runs north–south through the city concurrent with U.S. 27 and GA-91, and leads north 9 mi (14 km) to Damascus and southwest 14 mi (23 km) to Iron City. GA-91 also runs north–south through the city as well, and leads northeast 28 mi (45 km) to Newton and southwest 14 mi (23 km) to Donalsonville.

According to the United States Census Bureau, the city has a total area of 8.3 square miles (21 km^{2}), of which 0.04 square miles (0.10 km^{2}), or 0.48%, are water.

== Demographics ==
Historical population
Census	Pop.	Note	%±
1880	119		—
1900	320		—
1910	600		87.5%
1920	810		35.0%
1930	832		2.7%
1940	1,416		70.2%
1950	1,664		17.5%
1960	1,556		−6.5%
1970	2,026		30.2%
1980	2,065		1.9%
1990	1,991		−3.6%
2000	1,939		−2.6%
2010	1,992		2.7%
2020	2,001		0.5%
U.S. Decennial Census; 1850-1870 1870-1880; 1890-1910 1920-1930; 1940 1950 1960; 1970 1980 1990; 2000 2010

=== 2020 census ===
As of the 2020 census, Colquitt had a population of 2,001. The median age was 42.5 years. 22.6% of residents were under the age of 18 and 18.6% of residents were 65 years of age or older. For every 100 females there were 79.5 males, and for every 100 females age 18 and over there were 75.0 males age 18 and over.

0.0% of residents lived in urban areas, while 100.0% lived in rural areas.

There were 820 households in Colquitt, of which 30.6% had children under the age of 18 living in them. Of all households, 29.5% were married-couple households, 18.9% were households with a male householder and no spouse or partner present, and 44.4% were households with a female householder and no spouse or partner present. About 34.4% of all households were made up of individuals and 17.5% had someone living alone who was 65 years of age or older. There were 520 families residing in the city.

There were 925 housing units, of which 11.4% were vacant. The homeowner vacancy rate was 3.0% and the rental vacancy rate was 4.9%.

Colquitt racial composition as of 2020
Race	Num.	Perc.
White (non-Hispanic)	802	40.08%
Black or African American (non-Hispanic)	1,096	54.77%
Native American	3	0.15%
Asian	18	0.9%
Other/Mixed	51	2.55%
Hispanic or Latino	31	1.55%

== Education ==
Colquitt is part of the Miller County School District. It is served by:

- Miller County Elementary School
- Miller County Middle School
- Miller County High School

=== Public Library ===
Colquitt is home to the Miller County - James W. Merritt Jr. Memorial Library. The library serves the citizens of Miller County with a collection of print and audiovisual materials. The library is located at 259 E. Main Street in Colquitt.

== Notable people ==
- Peter Zack Geer, Lieutenant Governor of Georgia from 1963 to 1967
- Charles Grant, NFL football player
- Brandon Miller, National Football League player with the Atlanta Falcons and Seattle Seahawks
- Keyon Nash, professional football player with the Oakland Raiders, as well as the Rhein Fire of NFL Europe, and the Canadian Football League's Toronto Argonauts
- Gordie Richardson, Major League Baseball player with the St. Louis Cardinals and New York Mets
- Zula Brown Toole, first woman to found a newspaper in Georgia, the Miller County Liberal in 1897

== Gallery ==
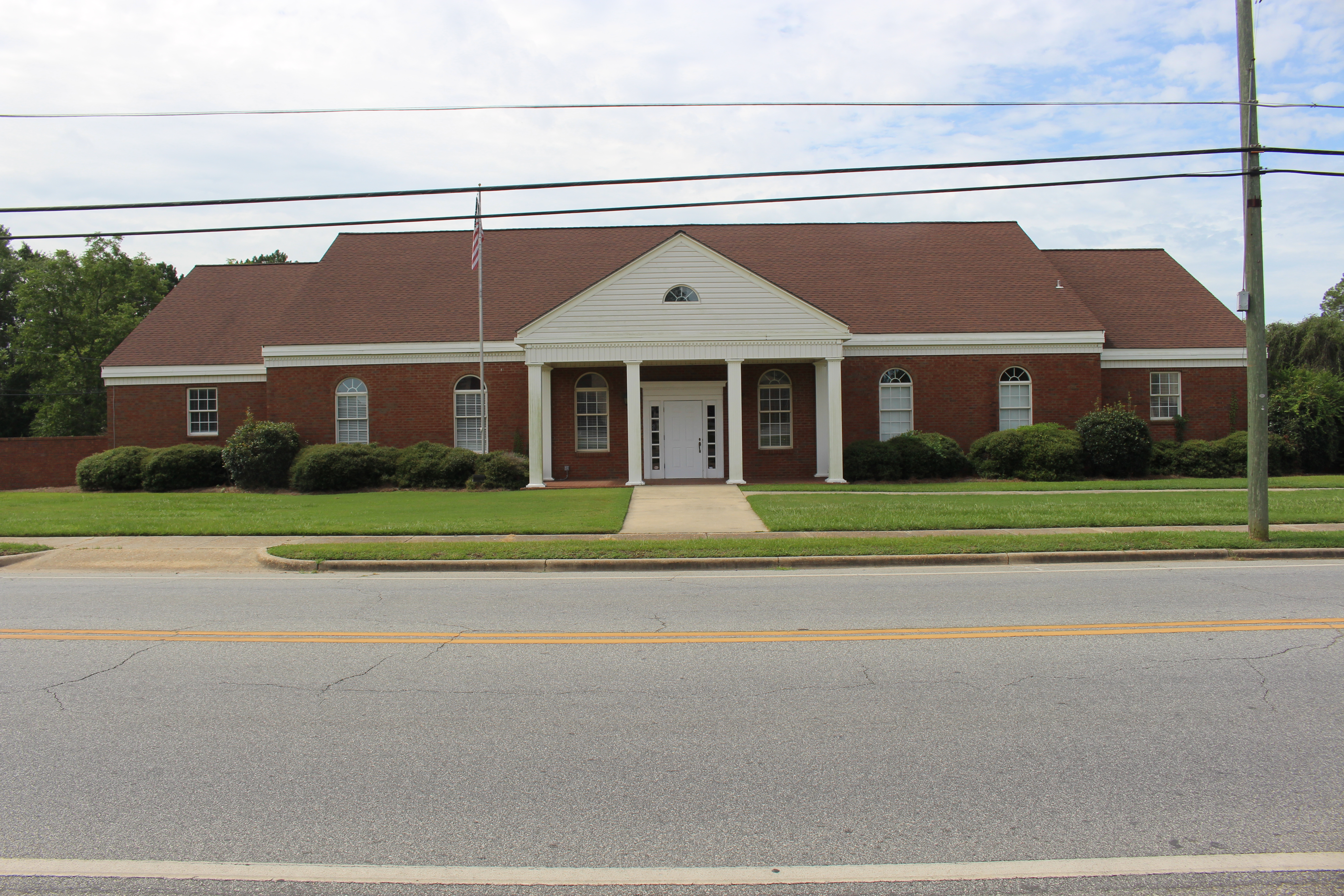
James W. Merritt Jr. Memorial Library

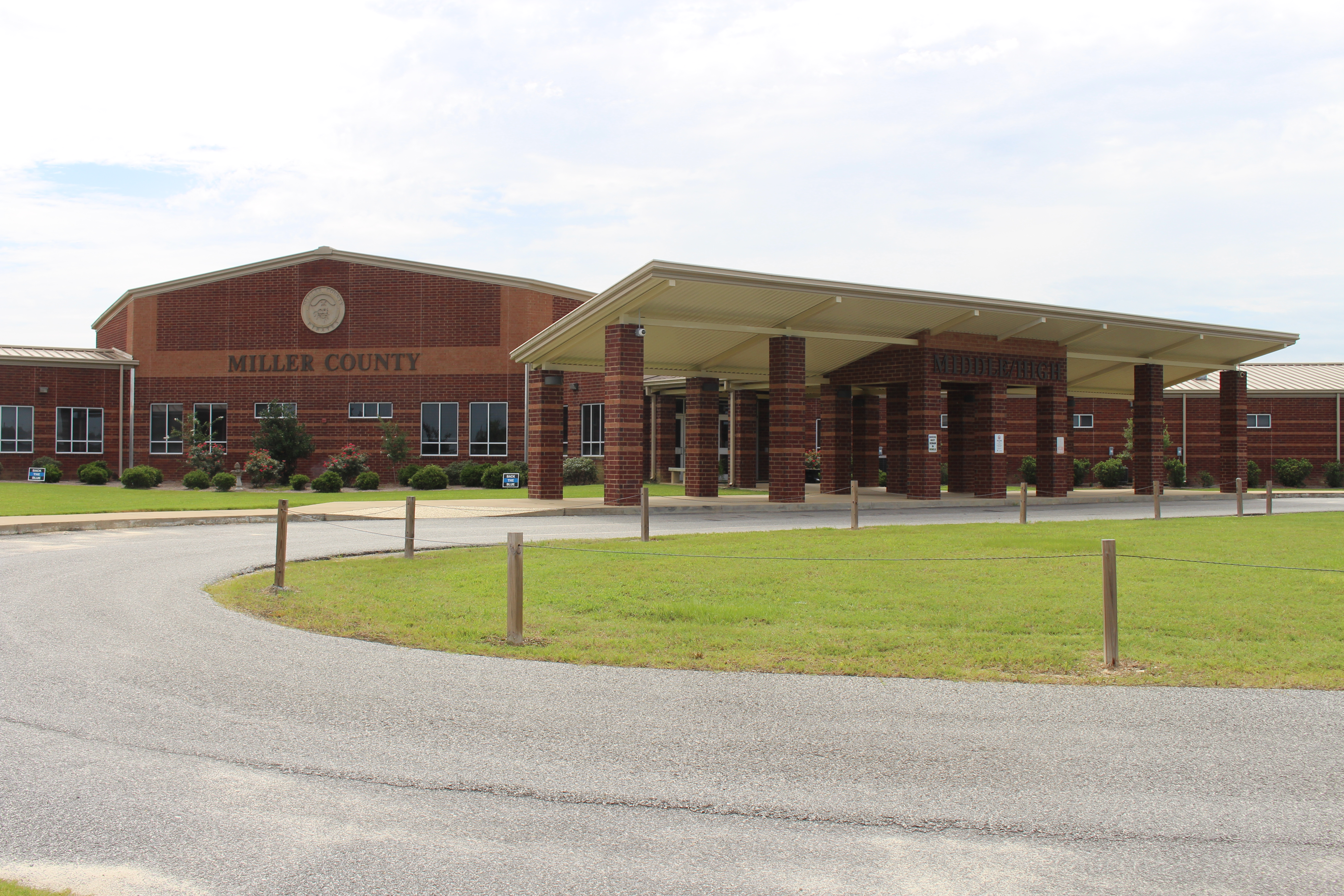
The middle/high school entrance of the Miller County School District school building

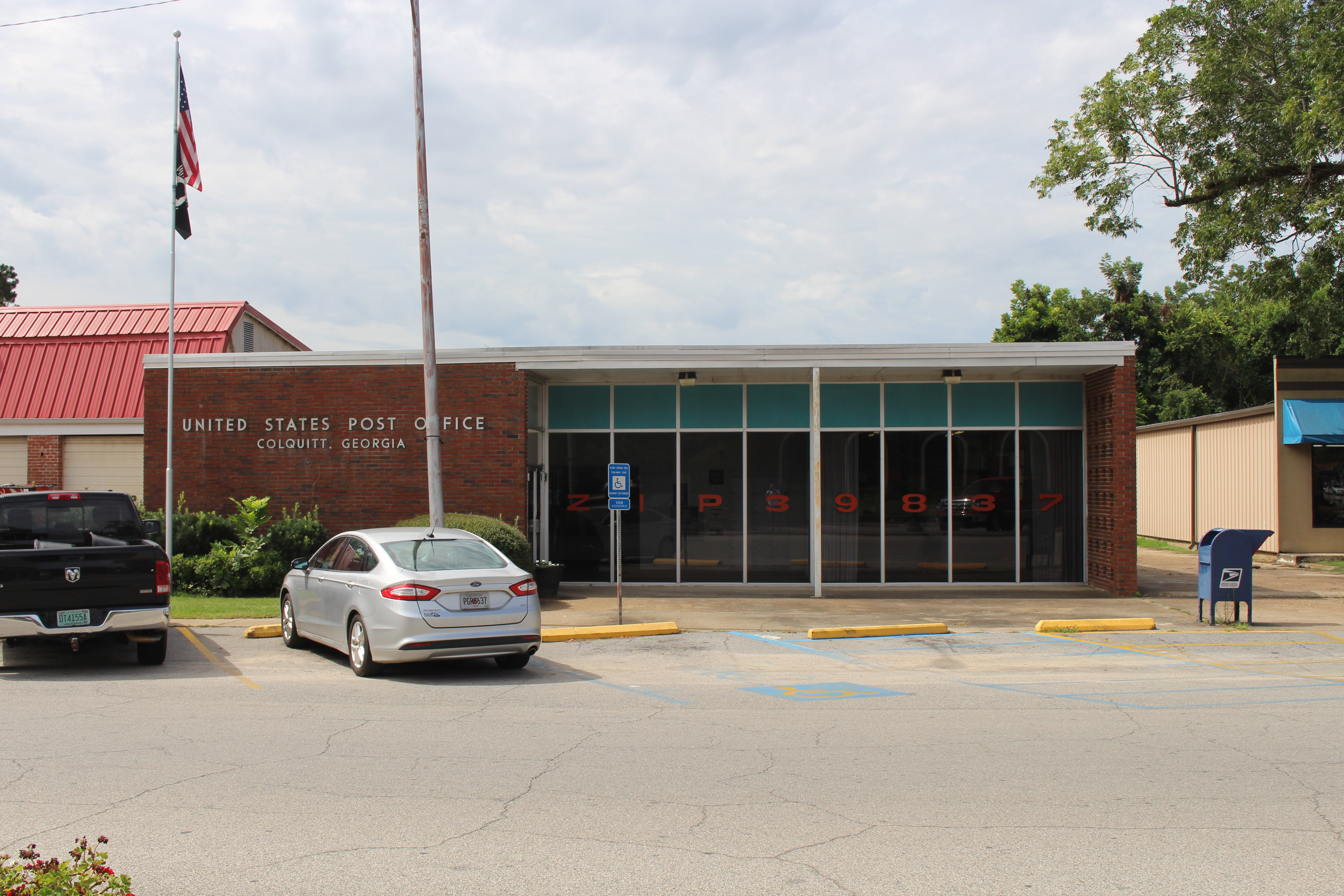
Colquitt Post Office

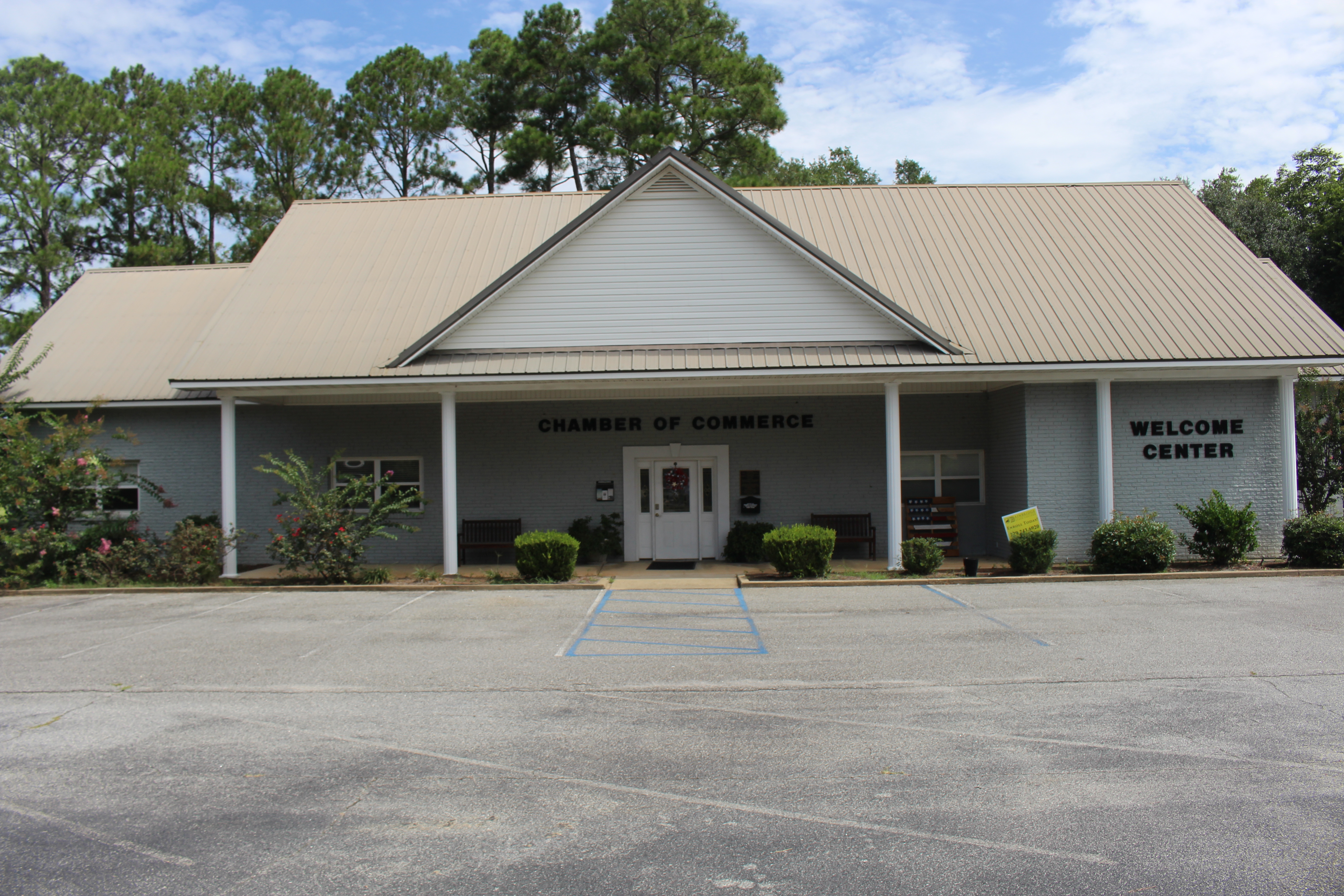
Colquitt-Miller County Chamber of Commerce and Welcome Center
